This is a list of historical figures who have been characters in opera or operetta.

Historical accuracy in such works has often been subject to the imperatives of dramatic presentation. Consequently, in many cases:
 historical characters appear alongside fictional characters
 historical characters who never met, or whose lives did not even overlap, appear on stage together
 historical events depicted are transported to earlier or later times or to different places
 historical people are seen participating in entirely fictional events, or vice versa
 the actions of historical people are attributed to other persons

For the purposes of this list, Biblical characters are generally taken to be fictional, unless there is clear evidence of their historicity.

Operas appear in bold when the historical figure is also the title role.

Where a character appears in more than opera, the entries are sorted by composer.

List of historical figures

A

Abdisho IV Maron, Patriarch of the Chaldean Catholic Church
 Hans Pfitzner: Palestrina (as Abdisu)

Peter Abelard, French priest, scholar, theologian
 Peter Tahourdin: Héloise and Abelard Charles Wilson: Héloise and Abelard

John Quincy Adams, American President
 Anthony Davis, Amistad
 Virgil Thomson: The Mother of Us All

Adelaide of Aquitaine, queen consort of France by marriage to Hugh Capet
 Gaetano Donizetti: Ugo, conte di Parigi

Gabriele Adorno, fifth Doge of Genoa
 Giuseppe Verdi: Simon Boccanegra

Flavius Aetius, Roman general
 Giuseppe Gazzaniga: Ezio
 George Frideric Handel: Ezio
 Gaetano Latilla: Ezio
 Giuseppe Verdi: Attila

Heinrich Cornelius Agrippa, German alchemist, writer
 Sergei Prokofiev: The Fiery Angel (as Agrippa of Nettesheim)

Marcus Vipsanius Agrippa, Roman statesman and general
 Samuel Barber: Antony and Cleopatra

Gnaeus Domitius Ahenobarbus, Roman consul (32 BC)
 Samuel Barber: Antony and Cleopatra (as Enobarbus)

Pharaoh Akhenaten of Egypt
 Philip Glass: Akhnaten

3rd Duke of Alba, Governor of the Spanish Netherlands
 Gaetano Donizetti, completed by Matteo Salvi: Le duc d'Albe
 Ernst Krenek: Karl V

Albert of Mainz, Elector and Archbishop of Mainz
 Paul Hindemith: Mathis der Maler (as Albrecht von Brandenburg)

Buzz Aldrin, American astronaut
 Jonathan Dove: Man on the Moon

Alexander the Great, King of Macedon
 Girolamo Abos: Alessandro nelle Indie
 George Frideric Handel: Alessandro
 George Frideric Handel: Poro
 José de Nebra: No todo indicio es verdad y Alexandro en Asia
 Giovanni Pacini: Alessandro nelle Indie
(He appears in about 70 other operas set to the same text by Metastasio as used by Pacini, including one by Leonardo Vinci.)

Emperor Alexander Severus of Rome
 George Frideric Handel: Alessandro Severo

Tsar Alexander I of Russia
 Sergei Prokofiev: War and Peace (silent role)

Brigadier General Edward Porter Alexander, American military commander
 Philip Glass: Appomattox

Tsarina Alexandra of Russia, consort of Tsar Nicholas II
 Deborah Drattell: Nicholas and Alexandra

Tsarevich Alexei Petrovich of Russia, son of Peter the Great
 Franz Lehár: Der Zarewitsch

Saint Alexius of Rome
 Stefano Landi: Il Sant'Alessio (1631; the first opera written on an historical subject)

Alfonso I d'Este, Duke of Ferrara, husband of Lucrezia Borgia
 Gaetano Donizetti: Lucrezia Borgia

Alfonso II d'Este, Duke of Ferrara
 Gaetano Donizetti: Torquato Tasso

King Alfonso XI of Castile
 Gaetano Donizetti: La favorite

King Alfred the Great, legendary Anglo-Saxon king
 Thomas Arne: Alfred
 Gaetano Donizetti: Alfredo il grande
 Antonín Dvořák: Alfred
 Friedrich von Flotow: Alfred der Große

Dante Alighieri: see Dante

Almanzor (Al-Mansur Ibn Abi Aamir), de facto ruler of al-Andalus
 Giacomo Meyerbeer: L'esule di Granata (as Almanzor)

Pedro de Alvarado, Spanish conquistador
 Lorenzo Ferrero: La Conquista
 Roger Sessions: Montezuma

Amalasuntha, Queen of the Ostrogoths
 André Messager: Isoline (as La Reine Amalasonthe)

Anacreon, Greek lyric poet
 Luigi Cherubini: Anacréon
 Jean-Philippe Rameau: Anacréon (1754 version)
 Jean-Philippe Rameau: Anacréon (1757 version)

Jacob Johan Anckarström, Swedish military officer, assassin of Gustav III
 Daniel Auber: Gustave III
 Giuseppe Verdi: Un ballo in maschera

Tommaso Aniello: see Masaniello

Anne of Bavaria, Holy Roman Empress, Queen of Rome and Bavaria
 Ignaz Holzbauer: Günther von Schwarzburg

Queen Anne of Great Britain
 Friedrich von Flotow: Martha (silent role)

Queen Anne (Boleyn), second consort of Henry VIII of England
 Gaetano Donizetti: Anna Bolena
 Camille Saint-Saëns: Henry VIII

Queen Anne (Neville), consort of Richard III of England
 Giorgio Battistelli, Richard III (2004)

Saint Anthony the Great
 Bernice Johnson Reagon: The Temptation of Saint Anthony

Susan B. Anthony, American women's rights activist
 Virgil Thomson: The Mother of Us All

Antiochus I Soter, King of the Seleucid Empire
 Étienne Méhul: Stratonice
 Jean-Philippe Rameau: Les fêtes de Polymnie

Rodrigo Ponce de León, 4th Duke of Arcos, Spanish grandee, Viceroy of Naples
 Antônio Carlos Gomes: Salvator Rosa

Margaret Campbell, Duchess of Argyll, British socialite and sexual celebrity
 Thomas Adès: Powder Her Face

Gustaf Mauritz Armfelt, Finnish-Swedish diplomat, possible lover of Gustav III of Sweden
 Daniel Auber: Gustave III

Arminius, Germanic chieftain
 George Frideric Handel: Arminio

Edwin H. Armstrong, American radio pioneer, inventor of FM radio transmission
 Evan Hause: The Birth and Theft of Television

Artabanus of Persia, political figure
 Thomas Arne: Artaxerxes

King Artaxerxes I of Persia
 Girolamo Abos: Artaserse
 Thomas Arne: Artaxerxes
 Antonio Sacchini: Artaserse
(He appears in over 40 other operas set to the same text from Metastasio's libretto Artaserse)

King Arthur, legendary king of Britain
 Isaac Albéniz: Merlin
 Grażyna Bacewicz: The Adventure of King Arthur
 Ernest Chausson: Le roi Arthus
 Henry Purcell: King Arthur
 Amadeu Vives i Roig: Artús
 Max Vogrich: King Arthur

Chester A. Arthur, American President
 Douglas Moore: The Ballad of Baby Doe

Ulrica Arfvidsson, Swedish fortune-teller
 Daniel Auber: Gustave III
 Giuseppe Verdi: Un ballo in maschera

Emanuele d'Astorga, Italian composer
 Johann Joseph Abert: Astorga

Atahualpa, Inca sovereign emperor
 Iain Hamilton: The Royal Hunt of the Sun

Attila the Hun
 Giuseppe Verdi: Attila

Atys, son of King Croesus of Lydia
 Reinhard Keiser: Croesus

Caesar Augustus, Roman Emperor
 Samuel Barber: Antony and Cleopatra (as Octavius Caesar)

Aurelian, Emperor of Rome
 Gioachino Rossini: Aureliano in Palmira

Pharaoh Ay of Egypt
 Philip Glass: Akhnaten

B

Francis Bacon, Irish painter
 Stephen Crowe: The Francis Bacon Opera

Cardinal Maffeo Barberini: see Pope Urban VIII

Michael Andreas Barclay de Tolly, Russian prince and general
 Sergei Prokofiev: War and Peace

Brigitte Bardot, French actress
 Igor Wakhévitch: Être Dieu: opéra-poème, audiovisuel et cathare en six parties (a creation of Salvador Dalí; the performer plays Bardot impersonating an artichoke)

Pyotr Fyodorovich Basmanov, Russian boyar
 Antonín Dvořák: Dimitrij

Daisy Bates, Irish-Australian indigenous welfare worker and anthropologist
 Margaret Sutherland: The Young Kabbarli

Bayezid I "The Thunderbolt", Ottoman Sultan
 George Frideric Handel: Tamerlano (as Bajazet)
 Antonio Vivaldi: Bajazet

Pierre Beaumarchais, French playwright
 John Corigliano: The Ghosts of Versailles

Saint Thomas Becket, Archbishop of Canterbury
 Ildebrando Pizzetti: Assassinio nella cattedrale

Belisarius, Byzantine general
 Gaetano Donizetti: Belisario

Augustin Daniel Belliard, French general
 Sergei Prokofiev: War and Peace

Belshazzar, Prince of Babylon
 Gioachino Rossini: Ciro in Babilonia (as Baldassare, King of Assyria)

Olga Benário Prestes, German-Brazilian communist militant
 Jorge Antunes: Olga

Levin August, Count von Bennigsen, German general
 Sergei Prokofiev: War and Peace

Queen Berenice III of Egypt
 George Frideric Handel: Berenice

Louis-Alexandre Berthier, Marshal of France
 Sergei Prokofiev: War and Peace

Joe Biden, Vice President of the United States
 Curtis K. Hughes: Say It Ain't So, Joe

Otto von Bismarck, first Chancellor of Germany
 Luigi Nono: Al gran sole carico d'amore

Harman Blennerhassett, Irish-American lawyer
 Walter Damrosch: The Man Without a Country

Blondel de Nesle, French troubador
 André Grétry: Richard Coeur-de-lion

Boabdil: see Muhammad XII of Granada

Francisco de Bobadilla, Spanish colonial administrator
 Alberto Franchetti: Cristoforo Colombo

Giovanni Boccaccio, Italian writer, poet
 Franz von Suppé: Boccaccio

Simone Boccanegra, first Doge of Genoa
 Giuseppe Verdi: Simon Boccanegra

George Boleyn, 2nd Viscount Rochford, brother of Anne Boleyn
 Gaetano Donizetti: Anna Bolena (as Rochefort)

Simón Bolívar, South American revolutionary
 Darius Milhaud: Bolivar
 Thea Musgrave: Simón Bolívar

Caroline Bonaparte, Queen Consort of Naples and Sicily, sister of Napoleon 
Pauline Bonaparte, Princess of France, sister of Napoleon
 Ivan Caryll: The Duchess of Dantzic

Lizzie Borden, American celebrity and possible axe-murderer
 Thomas Albert: Lizbeth
 Jack Beeson: Lizzie Borden

Jorge Luis Borges, Argentinian writer
 Juan María Solare: Veinticinco de agosto, 1983 (2 roles, Old Borges, baritone; and Young Borges, tenor)

Saint Francis Borgia, 4th Duke of Gandía, Spanish Superior-General of the Jesuits
 Ernst Krenek: Karl V

Lucrezia Borgia, daughter of Pope Alexander VI
 Gaetano Donizetti: Lucrezia Borgia

Saint Charles Borromeo, Italian cardinal
 Hans Pfitzner: Palestrina

Đurađ Branković, Serbian despot
 Ferenc Erkel: György Brankovics

Prince Braslav, Duke of Lower Pannonia
 Eugen Suchoň: Svätopluk

Ed Broadbent, Canadian politician
 Alexina Louie: Mulroney: The Opera

Gian Francesco Brogni, Italian cardinal
 Fromental Halévy: La Juive

John Hobhouse, 1st Baron Broughton, British memoirist and politician
 Virgil Thomson: Lord Byron

John Brown, Sergeant of the Second Battalion, Boston Light Infantry Volunteer Militia
 Walter Schumann: John Brown's Body

Pieter Bruegel the Elder, Flemish painter
 Jean Absil: Pierre Breughel l'Ancien

Antonín Brus z Mohelnice, Archbishop of Prague
 Hans Pfitzner: Palestrina (as Anton Brus von Müglitz)

Marcus Junius Brutus the Younger, Roman politician, co-assassin of Julius Caesar
 Giselher Klebe: Die Ermordung Cäsars

William Jennings Bryan, American Secretary of State, presidential candidate
 Douglas Moore: The Ballad of Baby Doe

Henry Stafford, 2nd Duke of Buckingham (1st creation)
 Giorgio Battistelli, Richard III (2004)

George Villiers, 2nd Duke of Buckingham (2nd creation), English poet, statesman
 Robert Planquette: Nell Gwynne

Gautama Buddha
 Max Vogrich: Buddha

Johannes Bureus, Swedish scholar
 Wilhelm Peterson-Berger: The Doomsday Prophets (as Johan Bure)

William Cecil, 1st Baron Burghley, English statesman, adviser to Elizabeth I
 Gaetano Donizetti: Maria Stuarda (as Lord Guglielmo Cecil)

Aaron Burr, third Vice President of the United States
 Walter Damrosch: The Man Without a Country

Anne Isabella Byron, Baroness Byron, wife of Lord Byron
 Virgil Thomson: Lord Byron

Lord Byron, English poet
 Agustí Charles: Lord Byron: un estiu sense estiu (Lord Byron: a summer without summer)
 Virgil Thomson: Lord Byron

C

Cacamatzin, Aztec king
 Roger Sessions: Montezuma

Alessandro Cagliostro (Giuseppe Balsamo), Italian adventurer and imposter
 Johann Strauss II: Cagliostro in Wien
 Mikael Tariverdiev: Graf Cagliostro

Maria Callas, American-Greek opera singer
 Michael Daugherty: Jackie O

Luís de Camões, Portuguese poet
 Gaetano Donizetti: Dom Sébastien

Kim Campbell, Prime Minister of Canada
 Alexina Louie: Mulroney: The Opera

Margaret Campbell, Duchess of Argyll, British socialite
 Thomas Adès: Powder Her Face

Lorenzo Campeggio, Cardinal Protector of England
 Camille Saint-Saëns: Henry VIII

Canek, Aztec High Priest
 Henry Kimball Hadley: Azora, the Daughter of Montezuma

Wolfgang Capito, German religious reformer
 Paul Hindemith: Mathis der Maler

Gerolamo Cardano, Italian mathematician and physician
 Mary Finsterer: Biographica (2017)

Carlos, Prince of Asturias, son of Philip II of Spain
 Giuseppe Verdi: Don Carlos

Julian Carlton, American murderer of Mamah Cheney, mistress of Frank Lloyd Wright
 Daron Hagen: Shining Brow

Enrico Caruso, Italian tenor
 Edwin Penhorwood: Too Many Sopranos (spoofed as "Enrico Carouser")

Giacomo Casanova, Italian adventurer and libertine
 Dominick Argento: Casanova's Homecoming
 Albert Lortzing: Casanova

Servilius Casca, co-assassin of Julius Caesar 
Gaius Cassius Longinus, Roman politician, co-assassin of Julius Caesar
 Giselher Klebe: Die Ermordung Cäsars

Fidel Castro, Cuban leader
 Luigi Nono: Al gran sole carico d'amore

Inês de Castro, lover and lawful wife of King Peter I of Portugal
 Vicent Lleó i Balbastre: Inés de Castro
 James MacMillan: Ines de Castro
 Thomas Pasatieri: Ines de Castro
 Giuseppe Persiani: Ines de Castro
 Niccolò Antonio Zingarelli: Ines de Castro

Sir William Catesby
 Giorgio Battistelli, Richard III (2004)

Empress Catherine I of Russia
 Gaetano Donizetti: Il falegname di Livonia, o Pietro il grande, czar delle Russie
 André Grétry: Pierre le Grand

Empress Catherine II "The Great" of Russia
 César Cui: The Captain's Daughter
 Igor Wakhévitch: Être Dieu: opéra-poème, audiovisuel et cathare en six parties (a creation of Salvador Dalí; Catherine does a striptease with Marilyn Monroe)

Queen Catherine (of Aragon), first wife of Henry VIII of England
 Camille Saint-Saëns: Henry VIII

Queen Catherine (Parr), sixth and last wife of Henry VIII
 Anthony Collins: Catherine Parr

Pierre Cauchon, French bishop
 Norman Dello Joio: The Triumph of St. Joan

Armand Augustin Louis de Caulaincourt, French general
 Sergei Prokofiev: War and Peace (silent role)

Guido Cavalcanti, Florentine poet
 Ezra Pound and George Antheil: Cavalcanti

Arthur Cecil, English actor, theatre manager
 Thomas German Reed (with W. S. Gilbert): Our Island Home

Cecily Neville, Duchess of York
 Giorgio Battistelli, Richard III (2004)

Benvenuto Cellini, Italian sculptor, goldsmith, artisan
 Hector Berlioz: Benvenuto Cellini
 Camille Saint-Saëns: Ascanio

Beatrice Cenci, Italian noblewoman, protagonist of a famous murder trial
 Havergal Brian: The Cenci (1951–52)
 Alberto Ginastera: Beatrix Cenci
 Berthold Goldschmidt: Beatrice Cenci
 Alessandro Londei e Brunella Caronti: Beatrice Cenci (2006)
 James Rolfe: Beatrice Chancy

Miguel de Cervantes, Spanish writer
 Rafael Aceves y Lozano: El manco de Lepanto
 Jacinto Guerrero: El huésped del sevillano, zarzuela (Cervantes appears as "el huésped")

Lindy Chamberlain and Michael Chamberlain, Australian parents wrongly convicted of the murder of their daughter Azaria
 Moya Henderson: Lindy

Charles Chaplin, British actor
 Salvador Bacarisse: Charlot

Charlemagne, King of the Franks
 Vincenzo Manfredini: Carlo Magno
 Franz Schubert: Fierrabras
 Carl Maria von Weber: Oberon

King Charles II of England
 Sir George Alexander Macfarren: King Charles II
 Robert Planquette: Nell Gwynne

King Charles II of Spain
 Jules Massenet: Don César de Bazan
 William Vincent Wallace: Maritana

Charles IV, Holy Roman Emperor
 Ignaz Holzbauer: Günther von Schwarzburg (as Karl, King of Bohemia)

Charles V, Holy Roman Emperor
 Ernst Krenek: Karl V
 Camille Saint-Saëns: Ascanio
 Giuseppe Verdi: Ernani
 Giuseppe Verdi: Don Carlos

King Charles VI of France
 Fromental Halévy: Charles VI

King Charles VII of France
 Walter Braunfels: Szenen aus dem Leben der Heiligen Johanna
 César Cui: The Saracen
 Norman Dello Joio: The Triumph of St. Joan
 Fromental Halévy: Charles VI
 Pyotr Ilyich Tchaikovsky: The Maid of Orleans
 Giuseppe Verdi: Giovanna d'Arco (as Carlo VII)

King Charles XI of Sweden
 Fredrik Pacius: Kung Karls jakt

Charles the Bold, Duke of Burgundy
 Giovanni Pacini: Carlo di Borgogna

Charles Martel, Duke and Prince of the Franks
 Jacques Offenbach: Geneviève de Brabant

Charmian, servant to Cleopatra
 Samuel Barber: Antony and Cleopatra
 Jules Massenet: Cléopâtre

Thomas Chatterton, English poet and forger
 Ruggero Leoncavallo: Chatterton
 Matthias Pintscher: Thomas Chatterton
 Gerard Victory: Chatterton

Geoffrey Chaucer, English author, poet, philosopher, courtier and diplomat
 Reginald De Koven: The Canterbury Pilgrims

Danny Chen, American army private who committed suicide in Afghanistan
 Huang Ruo: An American Soldier

Edwin Cheney, American electrical engineer 
Mamah Cheney, wife of Edwin Cheney, murdered mistress of Frank Lloyd Wright
 Daron Hagen: Shining Brow

André Chénier, French journalist
 Umberto Giordano: Andrea Chénier

Sir Richard Cholmondeley, Lieutenant of the Tower of London
Gilbert and Sullivan: The Yeomen of the Guard

Frédéric Chopin, Polish-French composer
 Giacomo Orefice: Chopin (very loosely based on his life; all the other characters are fictional)

Chou En-lai: see Zhou Enlai

Jean Chrétien, Canadian Prime Minister
 Alexina Louie: Mulroney: The Opera

Christina, Queen of Sweden
 Jacopo Foroni: Cristina, regina di Svezia
 Wilhelm Peterson-Berger: The Doomsday Prophets

Saint Christopher, revered but legendary saint
 Vincent d'Indy: La légende de Saint-Christophe

Tillius Cimber, co-assassin of Julius Caesar
 Giselher Klebe: Die Ermordung Cäsars (as Metellus Cimber)

Helvius Cinna, Roman poet
 Lorenzo Ferrero: Le piccole storie: Ai margini delle guerre
 Giselher Klebe: Die Ermordung Cäsars

Lucius Cornelius Cinna, Roman consul
 Wolfgang Amadeus Mozart: Lucio Silla

Henri Coiffier de Ruzé, Marquis of Cinq-Mars, French royal favourite of Louis XIII
 Charles Gounod: Cinq-Mars

George Plantagenet, 1st Duke of Clarence
 Giorgio Battistelli, Richard III (2004)

Emperor Claudius of Rome
 George Frideric Handel: Agrippina

Cleitus the Black, Macedonian soldier
 George Frideric Handel: Alessandro, (as Clito)

Pope Clement VII
 Hector Berlioz: Benvenuto Cellini
 Ernst Krenek: Karl V

Cleopatra VII, Pharaoh of Egypt
 John Adams: Antony and Cleopatra
 Samuel Barber: Antony and Cleopatra
 Domenico Cimarosa: La Cleopatra
 August Enna: Kleopatra
 Carl Heinrich Graun: Cesare e Cleopatra
 Louis Gruenberg: Antony and Cleopatra
 Henry Kimball Hadley: Cleopatra's Night
 George Frideric Handel:  Giulio Cesare (in Egitto)
 Jules Massenet: Cléopâtre
 Felip Pedrell: Cléopâtre
 Lauro Rossi: Cleopatra

Henry Clifford, 10th Baron de Clifford, English military commander
 Isaac Albéniz: Henry Clifford

Bill Clinton, US President
 Bonnie Montgomery: Billy Blythe

Hillary Clinton, American First Lady, Senator, Secretary of State
 Curtis K. Hughes: Say It Ain't So, Joe

Olivier de Clisson, Breton soldier
 Fromental Halévy: Charles VI

Cloelia, early Roman figure, possibly legendary
 Filippo Amadei, Giovanni Bononcini and George Frideric Handel: Muzio Scevola

Robert Coates, Canadian politician
 Alexina Louie: Mulroney: The Opera

Howell Cobb, American political figure
 Philip Glass: Appomattox

Walter Cocking, dean at the University of Georgia, the focus of the "Cocking affair"
 Michael Braz: A Scholar Under Siege

Horatius Cocles, Roman military officer
 Filippo Amadei, Giovanni Bononcini and George Frideric Handel: Muzio Scevola

Lucius Tarquinius Collatinus, Roman consul, husband of Lucretia
 Benjamin Britten: The Rape of Lucretia

Stefano Colonna (1265–1348), Roman political figure
 Richard Wagner: Rienzi

Christopher Columbus, Genoese explorer of the New World
 Leonardo Balada: Cristóbal Colón
 Leonardo Balada: Death of Columbus
 Ramon Carnicer: Cristoforo Colombo
 Werner Egk: Columbus
 Manuel de Falla: Atlántida
 Alberto Franchetti: Cristoforo Colombo
 Philip Glass: The Voyage
 Darius Milhaud: Christophe Colomb

Anthony Comstock, American morals campaigner
 Virgil Thomson: The Mother of Us All

Emperor Constantine I "The Great" of Rome
 Gaetano Donizetti: Fausta

Nicolaus Copernicus, Polish scientist
 Claude Vivier: Kopernikus

Charlotte Corday, French Girondin revolutionary
 Lorenzo Ferrero: Charlotte Corday

Saint Corentin of Quimper, Breton patron saint of seafood
 Édouard Lalo: Le roi d'Ys

Gaius Marcius Coriolanus, legendary Roman leader
 Francesco Cavalli: Coriolano

Catherine Cornaro, consort of James II of Cyprus
 Gaetano Donizetti: Caterina Cornaro
 Fromental Halévy: La reine de Chypre
 Franz Lachner: Caterina Cornaro

Giorgio Cornaro, Italian nobleman, father of Catherine Cornaro
 Gaetano Donizetti: Caterina Cornaro (as Andrea Cornaro)

Jeronimus Cornelisz, Dutch apothecary and merchant
 Richard Mills: Batavia

Hernán Cortés, Spanish conquistador
 Ruperto Chapí: Las naves de Cortés
 Lorenzo Ferrero: La Conquista
 Carl Heinrich Graun: Montezuma
 Henry Kimball Hadley: Azora, the Daughter of Montezuma
 Aniceto Ortega: Guatimotzin
 Wolfgang Rihm: Die Eroberung von Mexico
 Roger Sessions: Montezuma
 Gaspare Spontini: Fernand Cortez
 Antonio Vivaldi: Motezuma (as Fernando)

Thomas Cranmer, Archbishop of Canterbury
 Sir Peter Maxwell Davies: Taverner (not identified as such)
 Camille Saint-Saëns: Henry VIII

Marcus Licinius Crassus, Roman general and politician
 Francesco Cavalli: Pompeo Magno

Flavius Julius Crispus, Caesar of the Roman Empire
 Gaetano Donizetti: Fausta

Croesus, King of Lydia
 Reinhard Keiser: Croesus

Oliver Cromwell, English Puritan leader
 Salvatore Agnelli: Cromwell

Cuauhtémoc, Aztec king
Aniceto Ortega: Guatimotzin
 Roger Sessions: Montezuma

Sir Henry Cuffe, English politician
 Benjamin Britten: Gloriana

Cyrano de Bergerac, French dramatist and duellist
 Franco Alfano: Cyrano de Bergerac
 Walter Damrosch: Cyrano
 David DiChiera, orch. Mark Flint: Cyrano
 Eino Tamberg: Cyrano de Bergerac

Cyrus the Great, King of Persia
 Maria Teresa Agnesi Pinottini: Ciro in Armenia
 Francesco Cavalli: Ciro
 Reinhard Keiser: Croesus
 Gioachino Rossini: Ciro in Babilonia

D

Salvador Dalí, Spanish painter
 Xavier Benguerel: Jo, Dalí (I, Dalí)
 Igor Wakhévitch: Être Dieu: opéra-poème, audiovisuel et cathare en six parties (Dalí's creation; his character is in turn playing God)

Dalibor of Kozojed, Czech knight
 Bedřich Smetana: Dalibor

Dante Alighieri, Italian poet
 Tan Dun: Marco Polo
 Sergei Rachmaninoff: Francesca da Rimini
 Ambroise Thomas: Françoise de Rimini
 Giacomo Puccini: Gianni Schicchi

Georges Danton, French revolutionary figure
 John Eaton: Danton and Robespierre
 Gottfried von Einem: Dantons Tod

Jacques d'Arc, French farmer, father of Joan of Arc
 Giuseppe Verdi: Giovanna d'Arco (as Giacomo)

King Darius III of Persia
 Francesco Cavalli: Statira principessa di Persia

Sir William Davenant, English poet and playwright
 Gaspare Spontini: Milton

Louis-Nicolas Davout, Marshal of France
 Sergei Prokofiev: War and Peace

John Dee, British alchemist, astrologer, royal adviser
 Rufus Norris and Damon Albarn: Dr Dee: An English Opera (non-singing role)

Gotse Delchev, Macedonian revolutionary figure
 Kiril Makedonski: Goce

Marion Delorme, French courtesan
 Charles Gounod: Cinq-Mars

Camille Desmoulins, French revolutionary journalist, politician
 Gottfried von Einem: Dantons Tod

Bernal Díaz del Castillo, Spanish conquistador
 Roger Sessions: Montezuma

Jimena Díaz, wife of El Cid, ruler of Valencia
 Claude Debussy: Rodrigue et Chimène
 Giuseppe Farinelli: Il Cid della Spagna (as Climene)
 Jules Massenet: Le Cid (as Chimene)

Rodrigo Díaz de Vivar, "El Cid"
 Johann Caspar Aiblinger: Rodrigo und Ximene
 Peter Cornelius: Der Cid
 Claude Debussy: Rodrigue et Chimène
 Giuseppe Farinelli: Il Cid della Spagna
 Jules Massenet: Le Cid
 Antonio Sacchini: Il Cid

Georgi Dimitrov, Bulgarian Communist leader
 Luigi Nono: Al gran sole carico d'amore

Emperor Diocletian of Rome
 Henry Purcell: Dioclesian

Tsar Dmitri Ioannovich of Russia, the so-called "False Dmitriy I"
 Antonín Dvořák: Dimitrij
 Modest Mussorgsky: Boris Godunov

Dmitry Donskoy, Prince of Moscow, Grand Prince of Vladimir
 Anton Rubinstein: Dmitry Donskoy

Dobrynya Nikitich, legendary Kievan bogatyr
 Alexander Serov: Rogneda

Publius Cornelius Dolabella, Roman general
 Samuel Barber: Antony and Cleopatra

Saint Dominic, Domingo de Guzman, founder of the Dominicans
 Antonio Braga: San Domenico di Guzman

Lord Alfred "Bosie" Douglas, English writer, lover of Oscar Wilde
 Theodore Morrison: Oscar (non-singing role)

James Douglas, Lord of Douglas, Scots soldier, known as the "Black Douglas"
 Gioachino Rossini: Robert Bruce (pastiche)

Frederick Douglass, African-American social reformer, abolitionist, orator, writer, and statesman
 Ulysses Kay: Frederick Douglass
 Dorothy Rudd Moore: Frederick Douglass

György Dózsa, Hungarian leader of peasant revolt
 Ferenc Erkel: György Dózsa

Sir Francis Drake, English adventurer, pirate, politician
 Matthew Locke: The History of Sir Francis Drake

John Dryden, English poet
 Virgil Thomson: Lord Byron

King Duncan I of Scotland
 Ernest Bloch: Macbeth
 Giuseppe Verdi: Macbeth

E

Ana de Mendoza, Princess of Éboli, Spanish aristocrat
 Giuseppe Verdi: Don Carlos

Nelson Eddy, American tenor, actor
 Edwin Penhorwood: Too Many Sopranos (spoofed as "Nelson Deadly")

King Edward II of England
 Gioachino Rossini: Robert Bruce (pastiche)

King Edward III of England
 Gaetano Donizetti: L'assedio di Calais

King Edward IV of England
King Edward V of England (as Prince Edward)
 Giorgio Battistelli, Richard III (2004)

King Edward VI of England
 Priit Pajusaar: The Prince and the Pauper (2013)

Adolf Eichmann, German Nazi SS Head
 Erkki-Sven Tüür: Wallenberg

Albert Einstein, German-American scientist
 Paul Dessau: Einstein
 Philip Glass: Einstein on the Beach

Emperor Elagabalus of Rome (Marcus Aurelius Antoninus Augustus)
 Pietro Simone Agostini: Eliogabalo
 Francesco Cavalli: Eliogabalo

Eleanor of Austria, Queen Consort of Portugal and France
 Ernst Krenek: Karl V

Eleanor of Guzman, mistress of King Alfonso XI of Castile and mother of Henry II
 Gaetano Donizetti: La favorite (as Leonor de Guzmán)

Elisabeth, Queen of Bohemia
 Ignaz Holzbauer: Günther von Schwarzburg (as Asberta)

Elisabeth Farnese, Queen Consort to Philip V of Spain
 John Barnett: Farinelli

Elisabeth of Valois, daughter of Henry II of France and Catherine de' Medici, wife of Philip II of Spain
 Giuseppe Verdi: Don Carlos

Elisiv of Kiev
 Heorhiy Maiboroda: Yaroslav Mudriy

Queen Elizabeth I of Castile: see Queen Isabella I of Castile

Queen Elizabeth I of England (see also :Category:Operas about Elizabeth I)
 Thomas Arne: Eliza (she does not appear as a character as such, but the opera is named for her)
 Benjamin Britten: Gloriana
 Gaetano Donizetti: Il castello di Kenilworth
 Gaetano Donizetti: Maria Stuarda
 Gaetano Donizetti: Roberto Devereux
 Edward German: Merrie England
 Gioachino Rossini: Elisabetta, regina d'Inghilterra

Queen Elizabeth (Woodville), consort of King Edward IV of England
 Giorgio Battistelli, Richard III (2004)

Fanny Elssler, Austrian ballerina
 Arthur Honegger and Jacques Ibert: L'Aiglon

Ninon de l'Enclos, French courtesan
 Charles Gounod: Cinq-Mars

Enzio of Sardinia, king of Sardinia
 Johann Joseph Abert: König Enzio and Enzio von Hohenstaufen (2nd version)

Louise d'Épinay, French diarist, memoirist
 Reynaldo Hahn: Mozart (musical comedy)

Erasistratus, Greek anatomist, physician
 Étienne Méhul: Stratonice

King Eric V of Denmark
 Peter Arnold Heise: Drot og marsk (King and Marshall)

José de Espronceda, Spanish poet
 Federico Moreno Torroba: El poeta

Robert Devereux, 2nd Earl of Essex, Elizabethan courtier and royal favourite
 Benjamin Britten: Gloriana
 Gaetano Donizetti: Roberto Devereux
 Edward German: Merrie England

Frances, Countess of Essex, English noblewoman
 Benjamin Britten: Gloriana

Eufrosinia, daughter of Yaroslav Osmomysl, Prince of Halych
 Alexander Borodin: Prince Igor (as Yaroslavna)

F

Marino Faliero, Doge of Venice
 Gaetano Donizetti: Marino Faliero

Farinelli, Italian castrato singer
 Daniel Auber: La part du diable (or Carlo Broschi) (as Carlo Broschi)
 John Barnett: Farinelli

Philo Farnsworth, American television pioneer
 Evan Hause: The Birth and Theft of Television

Fausta Flavia Maxima, Empress of Rome, second wife of Constantine the Great
 Gaetano Donizetti: Fausta

Charles Simon Favart, French dramatist
 Jacques Offenbach: Madame Favart

Marie Favart, French opera singer, actress
 Jacques Offenbach: Madame Favart

Dianne Feinstein, American politician
 Stewart Wallace: Harvey Milk

Ferdinand I, Holy Roman Emperor
 Ernst Krenek: Karl V

King Ferdinand I of León and Castile
 Claude Debussy: Rodrigue et Chimène
 Jules Massenet: Le Cid

Ferdinand II, Holy Roman Emperor
 Paul Hindemith: Die Harmonie der Welt

King Ferdinand II of Aragon (and Ferdinand V of Castile)
 Giuseppe Apolloni: L'ebreo
 Leonardo Balada: Cristóbal Colón
 Leonardo Balada: Death of Columbus
 Darius Milhaud: Christophe Colomb

King Ferdinand VI of Spain
 Daniel Auber: La part du diable (or Carlo Broschi)

Roger de Flor, German-born soldier serving Aragon kings
 Ruperto Chapí: Roger de Flor

Errol Flynn, Australian-American film actor
 Judith Bingham: Flynn

James Forrestal, US Secretary of Defense
 Evan Hause: Nightingale: The Last Days of James Forrestal

Francesco Foscari, Doge of Venice
 Giuseppe Verdi: I due Foscari

Joseph Fouché, Duke of Otranto
 Umberto Giordano: Madame Sans-Gêne

Francesca da Rimini, contemporary and literary subject of Dante
 Emil Ábrányi: Paola és Francesca
 Alfredo Aracil: Francesca o El infierno de los enamorados
 Emanuele Borgatta: Francesca da Rimini
 Paolo Carlini: Francesca da Rimini
 Fournier-Gorre: Francesca da Rimini
 Pietro Generali: Francesca da Rimini
 Hermann Goetz: Francesca da Rimini
 Franco Leoni: Francesca da Rimini
 Gioacchino Maglioni: Francesca da Rimini
 Luigi Mancinelli: Paolo e Francesca
 Saverio Mercadante: Francesca da Rimini
 Francesco Morlacchi: Francesca da Rimini
 Eugene Nordal: Francesca da Rimini
 Salvatore Papparlado: Francesca da Rimini
 Gaetano Quilici: Francesca da Rimini
 Sergei Rachmaninoff: Francesca da Rimini (as Francesca Malatesta)
 Giuseppe Staffa: Francesca da Rimini
 Feliciano Strepponi: Francesca da Rimini
 Antonio Tamburini: Francesca da Rimini
 Ambroise Thomas: Françoise de Rimini
 Riccardo Zandonai: Francesca da Rimini

Saint Francis of Assisi, founder of the Franciscans
 Olivier Messiaen: Saint François d'Assise

King Francis I of France
 Ernst Krenek: Karl V (as Franz I)
 Camille Saint-Saëns: Ascanio

Anne Frank, Dutch diarist
 Grigory Frid: The Diary of Anne Frank

Emperor Franz Joseph I of Austria
 Ralph Benatzky, Robert Stolz and Bruno Granichstaedten: The White Horse Inn

John Allen Fraser, Canadian politician
 Alexina Louie: Mulroney: The Opera

Fredegund, Merovingian Queen Consort
 César Franck: Ghiselle
 Reinhard Keiser: Fredegunda (1715)

Frederick I "Barbarossa", Holy Roman Emperor
 Giuseppe Verdi: La battaglia di Legnano

King Frederick II "The Great" of Prussia
 Gavin Bryars, Philip Glass and others: The Civil Wars: A Tree Is Best Measured When It Is Down
 Giacomo Meyerbeer: Ein Feldlager in Schlesien (he does not appear on stage, but is heard playing the flute in the background)

Frederick II, Landgrave of Hesse-Homburg
 Hans Werner Henze: Der Prinz von Homburg

Frederick William I, Elector of Brandenburg
 Hans Werner Henze: Der Prinz von Homburg

Friedrich Friesen, German gymnast and soldier
 Wendelin Weißheimer, Theodor Körner

Jean Froissart, French chronicler
 Aulis Sallinen: Kuningas lähtee Ranskaan (The King Goes Forth to France)

Fruela I of Asturias, Fruela(or Froila) the Cruel, King of Asturias from 757 until his assassination in 768
 Franz Schubert: Alfonso und Estrella

Georg von Frundsberg, South German knight
 Ernst Krenek: Karl V

Tsar Fyodor II of Russia, son of Boris Godunov
 Modest Mussorgsky: Boris Godunov

G

Galileo Galilei, Italian scientist
 Philip Glass: Galileo Galilei

Vasily Vasilyevich Galitzine, Russian statesman
 Modest Mussorgsky: Khovanshchina

Galla Placidia, Roman regent, daughter of Emperor Theodosius I
 Jaume Pahissa i Jo: Gal·la Placídia (1913)

Vasco da Gama, Portuguese explorer
 Giacomo Meyerbeer: L'Africaine

Count Peter Gamba, associate of Lord Byron
 Virgil Thomson: Lord Byron

Mahatma Gandhi, Indian freedom advocate
 Philip Glass: Satyagraha

Garcilaso de la Vega, Spanish poet and soldier
 Ruperto Chapí: La muerte de Garcilaso

Giuseppe Garibaldi, Italian freedom fighter
 Gavin Bryars, Philip Glass and others: The Civil Wars: A Tree Is Best Measured When It Is Down

Margaret "Peggy" Garner, American slave who killed her own daughter rather than allow the child to be returned to slavery
 Richard Danielpour: Margaret Garner

Antoni Gaudí, Catalan architect
 Joan Guinjoan: Gaudí

Paul Gauguin, French painter
 Einojuhani Rautavaara: Vincent
 Michael Smetanin: Gauguin: A Synthetic Life (2000; libretto by Alison Croggon)
 Christopher Yavelow: The Passion of Vincent van Gogh

Artemisia Gentileschi, Florentine painter
 Laura Schwendinger:  Artemisia (2019)

King George III of the United Kingdom
 Peter Maxwell Davies: Eight Songs for a Mad King

Priscilla German Reed, English singer and actress 
Thomas German Reed, English composer and theatre manager
 Thomas German Reed (with W. S. Gilbert): Our Island Home

Carlo Gesualdo, Italian composer and murderer
 Marc-André Dalbavie: Gesualdo (2010)
 Francesco d'Avalos: Maria di Venosa (1992)
 Scott Glasgow: The Prince of Venosa (1998)
 Bo Holten: Gesualdo (2003)
 Franz Hummek: Gesualdo (1998)
 Alfred Schnittke: Gesualdo
 Salvatore Sciarrino: Luci mie traditrici (1998)

Allen Ginsberg, American poet
 Lorenzo Ferrero: Marilyn

Lisa del Giocondo, Italian woman, subject of Leonardo da Vinci's Mona Lisa
 Max von Schillings: Mona Lisa (as Mona Fiordalisa)

Salvatore Giuliano, Sicilian peasant
 Lorenzo Ferrero: Salvatore Giuliano

Godfrey of Bouillon, Frankish knight, leader of the First Crusade
 George Frideric Handel: Rinaldo (as Goffredo)

Boris Godunov, Tsar of Russia
 Modest Mussorgsky: Boris Godunov

Xenia Borisovna Godunova, daughter of Boris Godunov
 Antonín Dvořák: Dimitrij
 Modest Mussorgsky: Boris Godunov

Sir Eugene Goossens, English conductor and composer
 Drew Crawford: Eugene & Roie

Violet Gordon-Woodhouse, English harpsichordist
 Roger Scruton: Violet

St Maria Goretti, 20th century Catholic martyr
 Marcel Delannoy: Maria Goretti, radiophonic opera

Sidney Gottlieb,
 Evan Hause: Man: Biology of a Fall

Francisco Goya, Spanish painter
 Gian Carlo Menotti: Goya
 Michael Nyman: Facing Goya (he appears as a silent apparition)

Princess Grace of Monaco, American-born actress (as Grace Kelly)
 Michael Daugherty: Jackie O

Antonio Gramsci, Italian political theorist
 Luigi Nono: Al gran sole carico d'amore

Urbain Grandier, French priest
 Krzysztof Penderecki: The Devils of Loudun

Julia Dent Grant, American First Lady
 Philip Glass: Appomattox

Ulysses S. Grant, American President
 Philip Glass: Appomattox
 Virgil Thomson: The Mother of Us All

Thomas Gray, English poet
 Virgil Thomson: Lord Byron

Edvard Grieg, Norwegian composer 
Nina Grieg, Norwegian singer, cousin and wife of Edvard Grieg
 Edvard Grieg, arr. Robert Wright and George Forrest: Song of Norway

Gen Leslie Groves, American military officer
 John Adams: Doctor Atomic

Matthias Grünewald, German renaissance painter
 Paul Hindemith: Mathis der Maler

Teresa, Contessa Guiccioli, Italian mistress of Lord Byron
 Virgil Thomson: Lord Byron

Guinevere, wife of King Arthur of Britain
 Ernest Chausson: Le roi Arthus (as Guenièvre)

Francis, Duke of Guise, French nobleman
 André Messager: Le bourgeois de Calais

Günther von Schwarzburg, German king
 Ignaz Holzbauer: Günther von Schwarzburg

Saint Guntram, King of Burgundy
 César Franck: Ghiselle

King Gustav I of Sweden
 Giuseppe Apolloni: Gustavo Wasa

King Gustav III of Sweden
 Daniel Auber: Gustave III
 Giuseppe Verdi: Un ballo in maschera

Nell Gwyn, English actress, mistress of King Charles II
 Robert Planquette: Nell Gwynne

H

Hadrian, Roman emperor
 Pietro Metastasio: Adriano in Siria
 José de Nebra: Más gloria es triunfar de sí, o, Adriano en Siria

Emma, Lady Hamilton, English mistress of Horatio, Lord Nelson 
Sir William Hamilton, British diplomat, husband of Emma, Lady Hamilton
 Lennox Berkeley: Nelson

Hannibal, Carthaginian ruler
 Johann Adolph Hasse, Domènec Terradellas, Giovanni Battista Lampugnani and Pietro Domenico Paradies: Annibale in Capua

King Harald Hardrada (Harald III of Norway)
 Heorhiy Maiboroda: Yaroslav Mudriy
 Judith Weir: King Harald's Saga

Sir Thomas Hardy, 1st Baronet, British sea captain, commander of HMS Victory at the Battle of Trafalgar
 Lennox Berkeley: Nelson

Harold Godwinson (Harold II), Anglo-Saxon King of England
 Frederic Hymen Cowen: Harold or the Norman Conquest
 Judith Weir: King Harald's Saga

Frank Harris, Irish-American journalist, publisher
 Theodore Morrison: Oscar

Harun al-Rashid, Abbasid Caliph
 Carl Maria von Weber: Oberon

Hasdrubal Gisco, Carthaginian general
 Francesco Cavalli: Scipione affricano

William Hastings, 1st Baron Hastings
 Giorgio Battistelli, Richard III (2004)

Richard Hauptmann, American convicted murderer
 Cary John Franklin: Loss of Eden 

Wiebbe Hayes, Dutch soldier
 Richard Mills: Batavia

Heloïse, French nun associated with Peter Abelard
 Peter Tahourdin: Héloise and Abelard
 Charles Wilson: Héloise and Abelard

Sally Hemings, American mixed-race slave owned by Thomas Jefferson
 Damon Ferrante: Jefferson & Poe: A Lyric Opera

Henri, Prince of Condé, French noble
 Krzysztof Penderecki: The Devils of Loudun

Henrietta Maria of France, queen consort of Charles I of England
 Vincenzo Bellini: I puritani

Henry I, Duke of Guise
George Onslow: Le duc de Guise

King Henry II of England
 Gaetano Donizetti: Rosmonda d'Inghilterra (as Enrico II)
 Otto Nicolai: Rosmonda d'Inghilterra (given at the first performance as Enrico II)

King Henry III of Castile
 Amadeu Vives i Roig: La villana

King Henry III of France also as Henri de Valois, King of Poland, Grand Duke of Lithuania
 Emmanuel Chabrier: Le roi malgré lui
 George Onslow: Le duc de Guise

King Henry IV of France
 Fromental Halévy:  Le Roi et le batelier

King Henry V of England
 Gustav Holst: At the Boar's Head (as Prince Hal)

King Henry VII of England (as Henry, Duke of Richmond)
 Giorgio Battistelli, Richard III (2004)

King Henry VIII of England
 Sir Peter Maxwell Davies: Taverner (not identified as such)
 Gaetano Donizetti: Anna Bolena (as Enrico)
 Camille Saint-Saëns: Henry VIII

Henry the Fowler, Duke of Saxony, King of the Germans
 Richard Wagner: Lohengrin

Henry the Lion, German prince (Henry III of Saxony, Henry XII of Bavaria)
 Agostino Steffani: Henrico Leone

Marie-Jean Hérault de Séchelles, French revolutionary politician
 Gottfried von Einem: Dantons Tod

Hermann I, Landgrave of Thuringia
 Richard Wagner: Tannhäuser

E. T. A. Hoffmann, German author
 Jacques Offenbach: The Tales of Hoffmann

Fanny Holland, English singer and actress
 Thomas German Reed (with W. S. Gilbert): Our Island Home

Clasina Maria "Sien" Hoornik (1850–1904), Dutch alcoholic prostitute, sometime lover of Vincent van Gogh
 Einojuhani Rautavaara: Vincent

Pharaoh Horemheb of Egypt
 Philip Glass: Akhnaten

Count Claes Fredrik Horn, co-conspirator with Anckarström in the assassination of King Gustav III of Sweden
 Daniel Auber: Gustave III (as Dehorn)
 Giuseppe Verdi: Un ballo in maschera

Harry Houdini, Hungarian-American escapologist
 Peter Schat: Houdini

Hugh Capet, King of the Franks from 987 to 996, the founder and first king from the House of Capet
 Gaetano Donizetti: Ugo, conte di Parigi

Ladislaus Hunyadi, Hungarian statesman
 Ferenc Erkel: Hunyadi László

Stig Andersen Hvide, Danish marshal, later an outlaw
 Peter Arnold Heise: Drot og marsk (King and Marshal) (as Marshal Stig)

Queen Hypsicratea of Pontus, consort of Mithradates VI
 Francesco Cavalli: Pompeo Magno (as Issicratea)
 Alessandro Scarlatti: Mitridate Eupatore

I

Muhammad al-Idrisi, Andalusian cartographer, traveller
 Karol Szymanowski: King Roger (as Edrisi)

Gwen Ifill, American television journalist
 Curtis K. Hughes: Say It Ain't So, Joe

Saint Ignatius of Loyola, Spanish knight, founder of the Society of Jesus
 Virgil Thomson: Four Saints in Three Acts

Igor Svyatoslavich, Prince of Putivl, Novgorod-Seversk and Chernigov
 Alexander Borodin: Prince Igor

Jaakko Ilkka, Finnish peasant leader
 Jorma Panula: Jaakko Ilkka

Ingegerd Olofsdotter of Sweden
 Heorhiy Maiboroda: Yaroslav Mudriy

John Ireland, Dean of Westminster
 Virgil Thomson: Lord Byron

Isabeau of Bavaria, Queen Consort of Charles VI of France
 Fromental Halévy: Charles VI

Isabel Moctezuma (Teutile), daughter of Moctezuma II
 Antonio Vivaldi: Motezuma

Queen Isabella I of Castile
 Emilio Arrieta: La conquista de Granada
 Giuseppe Apolloni: L'ebreo
 Leonardo Balada: Cristóbal Colón
 Leonardo Balada: Death of Columbus
 Manuel de Falla: Atlàntida
 Alberto Franchetti: Cristoforo Colombo
 Philip Glass: The Voyage
 Vicente Martín y Soler: Una cosa rara
 Darius Milhaud: Christophe Colomb

Isabella of France, Queen Consort of Edward II of England and mother of Edward III
 Gaetano Donizetti: L'assedio di Calais (she is Edward III's wife in the opera; in real life, she was his mother)

Isabella of Portugal, Holy Roman Empress, Queen Consort of Aragon and Castile
 Ernst Krenek: Karl V

Tsar Ivan IV of Russia, "Ivan the Terrible"
 Georges Bizet: Ivan IV
 Nikolai Rimsky-Korsakov: The Noblewoman Vera Sheloga (unseen role; he is the father of Vera's child)
 Nikolai Rimsky-Korsakov: The Maid of Pskov

Izumi Shikibu, Japanese poet
 Salvatore Sciarrino: Da gelo a gelo

J

Jack the Ripper, unidentified murderer of English prostitutes
 Alban Berg: Lulu
 Phyllis Tate: The Lodger

King James II of Cyprus "James the Bastard of Lusignan"
 Gaetano Donizetti: Caterina Cornaro (as Lusignano)
 Fromental Halévy: La reine de Chypre (as Lusignan)

King James V of Scotland
 Gioachino Rossini: La donna del lago (in disguise as Uberto)

Lady Jane Grey, disputed Queen of England
 Henri Büsser: Jane Grey
Nicola Vaccai: Giovanna Gray

Queen Jane (Seymour), third consort of Henry VIII of England
 Gaetano Donizetti: Anna Bolena

Thomas Jefferson, American President
 Damon Ferrante: Jefferson & Poe: A Lyric Opera

Jérôme Bonaparte, King of Westphalia
 Karl Michael Ziehrer:  König Jérôme oder Immer Lustick

Jesus of Nazareth and his apostles
 Anton Cajetan Adlgasser: Christus am Ölberg
 Harrison Birtwistle: The Last Supper
 Constantine Koukias: Days and Nights with Christ (played by a non-singing dancer)
 Anton Rubinstein: Christus, sacred opera
 Josep Soler i Sardà: Jesús de Natzaret, opera

Jiang Qing Chinese figure, 4th wife of Mao Zedong
 John Adams: Nixon in China (as Chiang Ch'ing)
 Bright Sheng: Madame Mao

St Joan of Arc, French saint (see also :Category:Operas about Joan of Arc)
 Walter Braunfels: Szenen aus dem Leben der Heiligen Johanna
 Norman Dello Joio: The Triumph of St. Joan
 Giselher Klebe: Das Mädchen aus Domrémy
 Pyotr Ilyich Tchaikovsky: The Maid of Orleans
 Giuseppe Verdi: Giovanna d'Arco
 For details of other musical depictions of Joan of Arc, see Cultural depictions of Joan of Arc#Operas, oratorios, and vocal works

Joan I of Naples, Queen of Naples
 Juan Manén: Giovanna di Napoli

Joanna of Castile, Queen of Castile and Aragon
 Ernst Krenek: Karl V (as Juana)
 Enric Palomar: Juana

Juana I de Castilla, Queen of Castile and Aragon
 Alberto Garcia Demestres: Juana sin sielo

Patriarch Job of Moscow, Russian Orthodox prelate
 Antonín Dvořák: Dimitrij

John, Prince of Asturias, Spanish prince, son of Ferdinand II of Aragon and Isabella I of Castile
 Vicente Martín y Soler: Una cosa rara

King John of England
 Sir Arthur Sullivan: Ivanhoe (as Prince John)

Don John of Austria, Bavarian soldier in Spanish service, son of Charles V, Holy Roman Emperor
 Ruperto Chapí: Don Juan de Austria, zarzuela in 3 acts
 Isaac Nathan: Don John of Austria

John of Leiden, Dutch Anabaptist leader
 Giacomo Meyerbeer: Le prophète (as Jean de Leyde)

Andrew Johnson, American President
 Virgil Thomson: The Mother of Us All

Lyndon B. Johnson, American President
 Evan Hause: Nightingale: The Last Days of James Forrestal

Ben Jonson, English poet
 Virgil Thomson: Lord Byron

Joseph II, Holy Roman Emperor
 Georg Jarno: Die Försterchristl (or possibly a fictitious "Franz Joseph II of Austria")

Joséphine de Beauharnais, Consort of Napoleon I
 Emmerich Kálmán: Kaiserin Josephine

Julia Caesaris, daughter of Julius Caesar, 4th wife of Pompey the Great
 Francesco Cavalli: Pompeo Magno

Julius Caesar, Consul and Dictator of Rome
 Francesco Cavalli: Pompeo Magno
 Carl Heinrich Graun: Cesare e Cleopatra
 George Frideric Handel: Giulio Cesare (in Egitto)
 Giselher Klebe: Die Ermordung Cäsars
 Antonio Sartorio: Giulio Cesare in Egitto

K

Frida Kahlo, Mexican painter
 Robert Xavier Rodriguez: Frida

Christoph Kaufmann (or Kauffman), associate of Jakob Lenz
 Wolfgang Rihm: Jakob Lenz

Sir Edward Kelley, English occultist
 Rufus Norris and Damon Albarn: Dr Dee: An English Opera

Grace Kelly: see Princess Grace of Monaco

Ned Kelly, Australian outlaw and folk hero
 Luke Styles: Ned Kelly

John F. Kennedy, American President
 Michael Daugherty: Jackie O

Johannes Kepler, German astronomer, mathematician
 Philip Glass: Kepler
 Paul Hindemith: Die Harmonie der Welt

Ivan Andreyevich Khovansky, "Tararui" (chatterbox), Russian boyar
 Modest Mussorgsky: Khovanshchina

Edgar Ray Killen, KKK leader, murderer
 Philip Glass: Appomattox

Larry King, American talk-show host
 Mark-Anthony Turnage: Anna Nicole

Martin Luther King Jr.
 Philip Glass: Satyagraha

Henry Kissinger, American Secretary of State
 John Adams: Nixon in China

Aleksis Kivi, Finnish writer
 Einojuhani Rautavaara: Aleksis Kivi

Leon Klinghoffer, American ship passenger murdered by terrorists
 John Adams: The Death of Klinghoffer

Vasily Kochubey, Cossack hetman, associate of Ivan Mazepa
 Pyotr Ilyich Tchaikovsky: Mazeppa

Konchak, Polovtsian khan 
Konchakovna, his daughter
 Alexander Borodin: Prince Igor

Theodor Körner, German poet and soldier
 Wendelin Weißheimer, Theodor Körner

Maria Korp, Australian murder victim
 Gordon Kerry: Midnight Son

Tadeusz Kościuszko, Polish revolutionary hero
 Franciszek Salezy Dutkiewicz: Kościuszko nad Sekwaną (Kościuszko at the Seine; libretto by Konstanty Majeranowski)

Anne Kronenberg, American political administrator
 Stewart Wallace: Harvey Milk

Kublai Khan, Grand Khan of the Mongol Empire
 Tan Dun: Marco Polo

Mikhail Kutuzov, Russian field marshal
 Sergei Prokofiev: War and Peace

L

Ladislaus I of Poland: see Władysław I the Elbow-high

Ladislaus the Posthumous, Duke of Austria, King of Hungary and Bohemia
 Ferenc Erkel: Hunyadi László (as László V)

Lady Caroline Lamb, lover of Lord Byron
 Virgil Thomson: Lord Byron

Anne Françoise Elisabeth Lange, French actress, known as "Mademoiselle Lange"
 Charles Lecocq: La fille de Madame Angot

Adrienne Lecouvreur, French actress
 Francesco Cilea: Adriana Lecouvreur

Eleanor Agnes Lee, daughter of Robert E. Lee 
Mary Anna Custis Lee, wife of Robert E. Lee
 Philip Glass: Appomattox

General Robert E. Lee
 Gavin Bryars, Philip Glass and others: The Civil Wars: A Tree Is Best Measured When It Is Down
 Philip Glass: Appomattox

François Joseph Lefebvre, Marshal of France, Duke of Danzig
 Ivan Caryll: The Duchess of Dantzic
 Umberto Giordano: Madame Sans-Gêne

 His wife, née Cathérine Hubscher, later Duchess of Danzig
 Ivan Caryll: The Duchess of Dantzic (as Catherine Üpscher)
 Umberto Giordano: Madame Sans-Gêne

Guillaume Le Gentil, French astronomer
 Victor Davies: Transit of Venus

Robert Dudley, 1st Earl of Leicester, English courtier, favourite of Elizabeth I
 Gaetano Donizetti: Il castello di Kenilworth
 Gaetano Donizetti: Maria Stuarda (as Roberto)
 Gioachino Rossini: Elisabetta, regina d'Inghilterra

Augusta Leigh, half-sister and incestuous lover of Lord Byron
 Virgil Thomson: Lord Byron

Jakob Michael Reinhold Lenz, German writer
 Wolfgang Rihm: Jakob Lenz

Pope St Leo I "The Great"
 Giuseppe Verdi: Attila (as Leone)

Brother Leo, friend and confidant of Francis of Assisi
 Olivier Messiaen: Saint François d'Assise

Leonidas of Epirus
 George Frideric Handel: Alessandro

(i) Marcus Aemilius Lepidus, Roman triumvir
 Samuel Barber: Antony and Cleopatra

(ii) Marcus Aemilius Lepidus, heir to Roman emperor Caligula
 Reinhard Keiser: Octavia

Leszek I the White, High Duke of Poland 1194-1227
 Józef Elsner: Leszek Biały

Ada Leverson, British novelist
 Theodore Morrison: Oscar

Li Bai or Li Po, Chinese poet
 Tan Dun: Marco Polo

Liliuokalani, Queen of Hawaii
 Paul Abraham: Die Blume von Hawaii, operetta

Abraham Lincoln, American President 
Mary Todd Lincoln, American First Lady
 Gavin Bryars, Philip Glass and others: The Civil Wars: A Tree Is Best Measured When It Is Down
 Philip Glass: Appomattox

Anne Morrow Lindbergh, American writer and aviator
 Cary John Franklin: Loss of Eden 

Charles Lindbergh, American pioneer aviator
 Cary John Franklin: Loss of Eden 
 Paul Hindemith and Kurt Weill: Der Lindberghflug (Lindbergh's Flight). This was later changed by removal of Hindemith's contribution, renaming it to Der Ozeanflug (The Flight across the Ocean), and removal of Lindbergh's name. The opening line was changed from "My name is Charles Lindbergh" to "My name is of no account".

Judah Loew ben Bezalel, Bohemian Talmudic scholar
 Nicolae Bretan: Golem (as Rabbi Lőw)
 Eugen d'Albert: Der Golem

King Louis V of France
 Gaetano Donizetti: Ugo, conte di Parigi

King Louis VI of France
 Carl Maria von Weber: Euryanthe

King Louis XII of France
 André Messager: La Basoche

King Louis XIII of France
 Charles Gounod: Cinq-Mars

King Louis XIV of France
 Léo Delibes: Le roi l'a dit (unseen role; he is referred to by the other characters)

King Louis XV of France
 Michel Richard Delalande and André Cardinal Destouches: Les élémens (represented by a chorus)
 Leo Fall: Madame Pompadour

King Louis XVI of France
 John Corigliano: The Ghosts of Versailles

Francis Lovell, 1st Viscount Lovell
 Giorgio Battistelli, Richard III (2004)

Lucan, Roman poet
 Claudio Monteverdi: L'incoronazione di Poppea

Lucretia, Roman noblewoman raped by Sextus Tarquinius (legendary)
 Benjamin Britten: The Rape of Lucretia
 Ottorino Respighi: Lucrezia

Martin Luther, initiator of the Protestant Reformation
 Ernst Krenek: Karl V

Ludwig Adolf Wilhelm von Lützow, Prussian general
 Wendelin Weißheimer, Theodor Körner

M

Douglas MacArthur, American general
 Lorenzo Ferrero: Marilyn

Jeanette MacDonald, American soprano, actress
 Edwin Penhorwood: Too Many Sopranos (spoofed as "Just Jeannette")

Sir John A. Macdonald, first Prime Minister of Canada 
William McDougall, Canadian politician
 Harry Somers: Louis Riel

Ralph McGill, American anti-segregationist journalist
 Michael Braz: A Scholar Under Siege

Wilmer McLean, American Civil War figure
 Philip Glass: Appomattox

Colin McPhee, Canadian composer and musicologist
 Evan Ziporyn: A House in Bali

King Macbeth of Scotland
 Ernest Bloch: Macbeth
 Iain Hamilton: The Tragedy of Macbeth
 Salvatore Sciarrino: Macbeth
 Giuseppe Verdi: Macbeth

Lucius Aemilius Paullus Macedonicus, Roman general, natural father of Scipio Aemilianus
 Wolfgang Amadeus Mozart: Il sogno di Scipione, K. 126

Gaius Maecenas, political adviser to Octavian (Caesar Augustus)
 Samuel Barber: Antony and Cleopatra

Saint Magnus Erlendsson, Earl of Orkney
 Peter Maxwell Davies: The Martyrdom of St Magnus

Gustav Mahler, Austrian composer
 Tan Dun: Marco Polo

Marion Mahony, American architect and artist, wife of Walter Burley Griffin
 Daron Hagen: Shining Brow

Giovanni Malatesta, husband and murderer of Francesca da Rimini
 Sergei Rachmaninoff: Francesca da Rimini (as Lanciotto Malatesta)
 Riccardo Zandonai: Francesca da Rimini (as Giovanni lo Sciancato)

Malatestino Malatesta, Lord of Rimini
 Riccardo Zandonai: Francesca da Rimini (as Malatestino dall'Occhio)

Paolo Malatesta, brother-in-law and lover of Francesca da Rimini
 Sergei Rachmaninoff: Francesca da Rimini
 Riccardo Zandonai: Francesca da Rimini (as Paolo il Bello)

La Malinche, Aztec mistress of Hernán Cortés
 Lorenzo Ferrero: La Conquista
 Wolfgang Rihm: Die Eroberung von Mexico
 Roger Sessions: Montezuma

Mao Zedong, Chinese leader
 John Adams: Nixon in China (as Mao Tse-tung)

Madame Mao: see Jiang Qing

Jean-Paul Marat, Jacobin leader
 Lorenzo Ferrero: Charlotte Corday

Benedetto Marcello, Italian composer
 Joachim Raff: Benedetto Marcello

Alexey Maresyev, Russian fighter pilot
 Sergei Prokofiev: The Story of a Real Man

Margaret of Anjou, Queen consort to Henry VI of England
 Giacomo Meyerbeer: Margherita d'Anjou

Marguérite de Valois, consort of Henry IV of France/Henry III of Navarre
 Ferdinand Hérold: Le pré aux clercs
 Giacomo Meyerbeer: Les Huguenots

Maria Carolina of Austria
 Umberto Giordano: Madame Sans-Gêne

Sister Maria Celeste, Italian nun, illegitimate daughter of Galileo Galilei
 Philip Glass: Galileo Galilei

Maria Luisa Fernanda, Duchess of Montpensier, Infanta of Spain
 Johann Strauss II: Cagliostro in Wien

Marie Antoinette, Queen Consort of Louis XVI of France
 John Corigliano: The Ghosts of Versailles

Marie Louise, Duchess of Parma, wife of Napoleon I
 Arthur Honegger and Jacques Ibert: L'Aiglon

Marie Louise Gonzaga, French Queen consort to 2 Polish kings
 Charles Gounod: Cinq-Mars

Empress Maria Theresa of Austria
 Johann Strauss II: Cagliostro in Wien

Guadalupe Marín, Mexican model and novelist, second wife of Diego Rivera
 Robert Xavier Rodriguez: Frida (as Lupe)

Mark Antony, Roman politician and general
 John Adams: Antony and Cleopatra
 Samuel Barber: Antony and Cleopatra
 Domenico Cimarosa: La Cleopatra
 Louis Gruenberg: Antony and Cleopatra
 Henry Kimball Hadley: Cleopatra's Night
 Giselher Klebe: Die Ermordung Cäsars
 Jules Massenet: Cléopâtre

Auguste de Marmont
 Arthur Honegger and Jacques Ibert: L'Aiglon

Martyrs of Compiègne, a group of French Carmelite nuns
 Francis Poulenc: Dialogues of the Carmelites

Saint Mary of Egypt, patron saint of penitents
 Ottorino Respighi: Maria egiziaca
 John Tavener: Mary of Egypt

Mary, Queen of Scots
 Gaetano Donizetti: Maria Stuarda
 Thea Musgrave: Mary, Queen of Scots
 Louis Niedermeyer: Marie Stuart

Queen Mary I of England "Bloody Mary"
 Antônio Carlos Gomes: Maria Tudor
Giovanni Pacini: Maria, regina d'Inghilterra

Mary Tudor, Queen of France, sister of Henry VIII, husband of Louis XII
 André Messager: La Basoche

Masaniello (Tommaso Aniello), Neapolitan fisherman, revolutionary leader
 Daniel Auber: La muette de Portici (aka Masaniello)
 Antônio Carlos Gomes: Salvator Rosa
 Reinhard Keiser: Masagniello
 Reinhard Keiser: Die neapolitanische Fischer-Empörung oder Masaniello furioso
 Jacopo Napoli: Mas' Aniello

Masinissa, first King of Numidia
 Francesco Cavalli: Scipione affricano

Mata Hari, Dutch spy
 Gavin Bryars, Philip Glass and others: The Civil Wars: A Tree Is Best Measured When It Is Down

Matthias, Holy Roman Emperor
 Antonín Dvořák: King and Charcoal Burner

King Matthias Corvinus of Hungary
 Ferenc Erkel: Hunyadi László (as Mátyás Hunyadi)

Maurice, Elector of Saxony
 Ernst Krenek: Karl V

Maurice de Saxe
 Francesco Cilea: Adriana Lecouvreur
 Jacques Offenbach: Madame Favart

Marcus Aurelius Valerius Maximianus Herculius, aka Maximian, Roman ruler
 Gaetano Donizetti: Fausta

Maximinian, co-Emperor of Rome
 Henry Purcell: Dioclesian

Ivan Mazepa, Cossack hetman, military leader
 Pyotr Ilyich Tchaikovsky: Mazeppa

Col. Robert R. McCormick, American newspaper publisher
 Alexina Louie: Mulroney: The Opera

Catherine de' Medici
George Onslow: Le duc de Guise

Cosimo de' Medici, ruler of Florence
 Fromental Halévy: Guido et Ginevra

Giuliano de' Medici, son of Lorenzo the Magnificent 
Lorenzo de' Medici, "Lorenzo the Magnificent", Italian statesman
 Ruggero Leoncavallo: I Medici

Lorenzino de' Medici, Italian writer and assassin
 Giovanni Pacini: Lorenzino de' Medici

Ottoman Sultan Mehmed II
 Gioachino Rossini: Maometto II
 Gioachino Rossini: Le siège de Corinthe (as Mahomet II)

Aleksandr Danilovich Menshikov, Russian statesman
 André Grétry: Pierre le Grand

Bartolomeo Merelli, Italian impresario and librettist
 Lorenzo Ferrero: Risorgimento!

Valeria Messalina, Roman Empress
 Isidore de Lara: Messaline

Caecilia Metella Dalmatica, fourth wife of Lucius Cornelius Sulla
 George Frideric Handel: Silla

Cornelia Metella, Pompey's second wife
 George Frideric Handel:  Giulio Cesare (in Egitto) (as Cornelia)

Klemens Wenzel, Prince von Metternich
 Arthur Honegger and Jacques Ibert: L'Aiglon

Harvey Milk, American politician and gay activist
 Stewart Wallace: Harvey Milk

Christina Miller, Scottish chemist
 Julian Wagstaff: Breathe Freely

John Milton, English poet
 Gaspare Spontini: Milton
 Virgil Thomson: Lord Byron

Gilbert Elliot-Murray-Kynynmound, 1st Earl of Minto, Scottish diplomat, Governor-General of India
 Lennox Berkeley: Nelson

King Mithridates VI of Pontus
 Francesco Cavalli: Pompeo Magno
 Wolfgang Amadeus Mozart: Mitridate, re di Ponto
 Alessandro Scarlatti: Mitridate Eupatore
 Domènec Terradellas: Mitridate

Marina Mniszech, Polish noble and Russian political adventurer
 Antonín Dvořák: Dimitrij
 Modest Mussorgsky: Boris Godunov

Moctezuma II, Aztec ruler
 Lorenzo Ferrero: La Conquista
 Carl Heinrich Graun: Montezuma
 Henry Kimball Hadley: Azora, the Daughter of Montezuma
 Josef Mysliveček: Motezuma
 Wolfgang Rihm: Die Eroberung von Mexico
 Antonio Sacchini: Montezuma
 Roger Sessions: Montezuma
 Antonio Vivaldi: Motezuma
 Niccolò Antonio Zingarelli: Montesuma

King Mojmír II of Great Moravia
 Eugen Suchoň: Svätopluk

Marilyn Monroe, American actress
 Gavin Bryars: Marilyn Forever 
 Lorenzo Ferrero: Marilyn
 Igor Wakhévitch: Être Dieu: opéra-poème, audiovisuel et cathare en six parties (a creation of Salvador Dalí; Monroe is doing a striptease with Catherine the Great of Russia)

Guy de Montfort, Count of Nola, Anglo-Italian condottiero
 Giuseppe Verdi:  Les vêpres siciliennes

Thomas Moore, Irish poet, songwriter
 Virgil Thomson: Lord Byron

Mordred, legendary Arthurian character
 Isaac Albéniz: Merlin
 Ernest Chausson: Le roi Arthus

Thomas Morton, American colonist of New England
 Howard Hanson: Merry Mount

George Moscone, Mayor of San Francisco
 Stewart Wallace: Harvey Milk

Moses, biblical character
 Gioacchino Rossini: Mosè in Egitto
 Arnold Schoenberg: Moses und Aron
 Myroslav Skoryk: Moses

Charles Blount, 8th Baron Mountjoy, Elizabethan figure
 Benjamin Britten: Gloriana

Wolfgang Amadeus Mozart, Austrian composer
 P. D. Q. Bach (Peter Schickele): A Little Nightmare Music
 Reynaldo Hahn: Mozart (musical comedy)
 Nikolai Rimsky-Korsakov: Mozart and Salieri

Gaius Mucius Scaevola, Roman figure
 Francesco Cavalli: Mutio Scevola
 George Frideric Handel: Muzio Scevola

Muhammad XII of Granada, aka Boabdil, last Nasrid ruler of Granada
 Giuseppe Apolloni: L'ebreo
 Emilio Arrieta: La conquista di Granata
 Moritz Moszkowski: Boabdil der letzte Maurenkönig
 Baltasar Saldoni: Boabdil, ultimo rey de Granada

Brian Mulroney, Prime Minister of Canada
Mila Mulroney, Canadian First Lady
 Alexina Louie: Mulroney: The Opera

Ottoman Sultan Murad II
 Antonio Vivaldi: Scanderbeg (as Amurat II)

Bartolomé Esteban Murillo, Spanish Baroque painter
 Josep Soler i Sardà: Murillo

John Murray II, British publisher
 Virgil Thomson: Lord Byron

Eadweard Muybridge, English pioneer photographer
 Philip Glass: The Photographer

N

Emperor Napoleon I of France (Napoleon Bonaparte)
 Ivan Caryll: The Duchess of Dantzic
 Eugen d'Albert: Der Stier von Olivera
 Umberto Giordano: Madame Sans-Gêne
 Emmerich Kálmán: Kaiserin Josephine
 Sergei Prokofiev: War and Peace

Emperor Napoleon II of France
 Arthur Honegger and Jacques Ibert: L'Aiglon
 Petar Stojanović: Napoleon II: Herzog von Reichstadt

Louis, comte de Narbonne-Lara
 Ivan Caryll: The Duchess of Dantzic (as Comte de Narbonne)

Carrie Nation, American temperance advocate and vandal
 Douglas Moore: Carry Nation

Nebuchadnezzar II, ruler of Babylon
 Benjamin Britten: The Burning Fiery Furnace
 Giuseppe Verdi: Nabucco

Nefertiti, wife of Pharaoh Akhenaten of Egypt
 Philip Glass: Akhnaten

Adam Albert von Neipperg, Austrian general
 Umberto Giordano: Madame Sans-Gêne

Frances Nelson, Lady Nelson, wife of Lord Nelson
 Lennox Berkeley: Nelson

Horatio Nelson, 1st Viscount Nelson, British admiral, naval hero
 Lennox Berkeley: Nelson

Emperor Nero of Rome
 Arrigo Boito: Nerone
 George Frideric Handel: Agrippina
 Reinhard Keiser: Octavia
 Juan Manén: Acté and Neró i Acté
 Pietro Mascagni: Nerone (as Claudio Cesare Nerone)
 Claudio Monteverdi: L'incoronazione di Poppea
 Anton Rubinstein: Néron

Tsar Nicholas II of Russia
 Deborah Drattell: Nicholas and Alexandra

Nitocris, Queen of Egypt, maybe legendary
 Maria Teresa Agnesi Pinottini: Nitocri

Pat Nixon, American First Lady
 John Adams: Nixon in China

Richard Nixon, American President
 John Adams: Nixon in China

Rikard Nordraak, Norwegian composer
 Edvard Grieg, arr. Robert Wright and George Forrest: Song of Norway

Thomas Howard, 3rd Duke of Norfolk, English politician, uncle to two of Henry VIII's wives
 Camille Saint-Saëns: Henry VIII

Thomas Howard, 4th Duke of Norfolk, English nobleman
 Gioachino Rossini: Elisabetta, regina d'Inghilterra

Rosaleen Norton, so-called "Witch of Kings Cross", Sydney occultist
 Drew Crawford: Eugene & Roie

Charles Howard, 1st Earl of Nottingham, English admiral and statesman
 Gaetano Donizetti: Roberto Devereux

O

J. F. Oberlin, Alsatian pastor, philanthropist
 Wolfgang Rihm: Jakob Lenz

Empress Claudia Octavia of Rome, consort of Nero
 Reinhard Keiser: Octavia
 Claudio Monteverdi: L'incoronazione di Poppea

Octavia the Younger, fourth wife of Mark Antony
 Samuel Barber: Antony and Cleopatra
 Jules Massenet: Cléopâtre

King Olaf I Tryggvason of Norway
 Ragnar Søderlind: Olav Tryggvason

King Olaf II of Norway (St. Olaf)
 Judith Weir: King Harald's Saga

Frank Olson, American biochemist
 Evan Hause: Man: Biology of a Fall

Aristotle Onassis, Greek shipping magnate
 Michael Daugherty: Jackie O

Jacqueline Kennedy Onassis, American First Lady, wife of John F. Kennedy, then of Aristotle Onassis
 Michael Daugherty: Jackie O

J. Robert Oppenheimer, American physicist
 John Adams: Doctor Atomic

Sallustia Orbiana, wife of Emperor Alexander Severus of Rome
 George Frideric Handel: Alessandro Severo

Pylyp Orlyk, associate of Ivan Mazepa
 Pyotr Ilyich Tchaikovsky: Mazeppa

Pier Francesco Orsini, Italian condottiero
 Alberto Ginastera: Bomarzo

Emperor Marcus Salvius Otho of Rome
 Antonio Vivaldi: Ottone in villa

P-Q

María de Padilla, mistress and secret wife of Peter of Castile
 Gaetano Donizetti: Maria Padilla

Niccolò Paganini, Italian violinist and composer
 Sir Harrison Birtwistle: The Second Mrs Kong

Giovanni Pierluigi da Palestrina, Italian composer
 Hans Pfitzner: Palestrina
 Johann Sachs: Palestrina

Sarah Palin, American politician, Governor of Alaska, vice-presidential candidate
 Curtis K. Hughes: Say It Ain't So, Joe

Papantzin, Aztec princess, sister of Moctezuma II
 Henry Kimball Hadley: Azora, the Daughter of Montezuma

Johan Papegoja, Governor of New Sweden
 Wilhelm Peterson-Berger: The Doomsday Prophets

Ely S. Parker, American Seneca native, Commissioner of Indian Affairs
 Philip Glass: Appomattox

Boris Pasternak, Russian novelist
 Nigel Osborne: The Electrification of the Soviet Union (narrator)

Francisco Pelsaert, Dutch merchant, naval commander
 Richard Mills: Batavia

Samuel Pepys, English diarist
 Albert Coates: Samuel Pepys

Henry Percy, 6th Earl of Northumberland
 Gaetano Donizetti: Anna Bolena

Alonso Pérez de Guzmán, Castilian nobleman, known as Guzmán el Bueno
 Tomás Bretón: Guzmán el Bueno
 Baltasar Saldoni: Guzmán el Bueno

Giovanni Battista Pergolesi, Italian composer
 Emilio Arrieta: Pergolesi
 Paolo Serrao: Pergolesi

Pericles, Athenian statesman
 Henri Christiné: Phi-Phi

Saint Peter, Christian apostle
 Harrison Birtwistle: The Last Supper
 Edwin Penhorwood: Too Many Sopranos

King Peter III of Aragon, "Peter the Great"
 Hector Berlioz: Béatrice et Bénédict (Don Pedro)
 Felip Pedrell: Els Pirineus
 Charles Villiers Stanford: Much ado about nothing

King Peter of Castile, "Peter the Cruel"
 Gaetano Donizetti: Maria Padilla (as Don Pedro, Prince of Castile)
 Hilarión Eslava: Pietro il Crudele

Tsar Peter I "The Great" of Russia
 Gaetano Donizetti: Il falegname di Livonia, o Pietro il grande, czar delle Russie
 Gaetano Donizetti: Il borgomastro di Saardam
 André Grétry: Pierre le Grand
 Louis-Antoine Jullien: Pietro il grande (1852)
 Albert Lortzing: Zar und Zimmermann
 Giacomo Meyerbeer: L'étoile du nord

Peter the Hermit, priest and leader of the First Crusade
 Charles Gounod: La nonne sanglante

Gaius Petronius Arbiter, Roman courtier, writer
 Claudio Monteverdi: L'incoronazione di Poppea

Michele Pezza, Neapolitan guerilla leader, known as "Fra Diavolo"
 Daniel Auber: Fra Diavolo

King Pharnaces II of Pontus
 Francesco Cavalli: Pompeo Magno (as Farnace)
 Francesco Corselli: Farnace
 Wolfgang Amadeus Mozart: Mitridate, re di Ponto
 Josef Mysliveček: Farnace
 Alessandro Scarlatti: Mitridate Eupatore
 Leonardo Vinci: Farnace
 Antonio Vivaldi: Farnace

Phidias, Greek sculptor
 Henri Christiné: Phi-Phi

King Philip II of Spain
 Isaac Nathan: Don John of Austria (disguised as Count de Santa Fiore)
 Giuseppe Verdi: Don Carlos

King Philip V of Spain
 John Barnett: Farinelli

Mariana de Pineda, Spanish liberalist heroine.
 Alberto Garcia Demestres: Mariana en sombras 

Gaspare Pisciotta, Sicilian peasant
 Lorenzo Ferrero: Salvatore Giuliano 

Gaius Calpurnius Piso, Roman senator
 Reinhard Keiser: Octavia

Pope Pius IV
 Hans Pfitzner: Palestrina

Sylvia Plath
 Adriana Hölszky: Giuseppe e Sylvia (2000) 

Edgar Allan Poe, American writer
 Dominic Argento, The Voyage of Edgar Allan Poe
 Damon Ferrante: Jefferson & Poe: A Lyric Opera

Poliziano (Angelo Ambrogini), Italian renaissance poet, scholar
 Ruggero Leoncavallo: I Medici

Marco Polo, Italian adventurer
 Tan Dun: Marco Polo

Saint Polyeuctus
 Gaetano Donizetti: Poliuto
 Charles Gounod: Polyeucte

Lorenz Truchsess von Pommersfelden
 Paul Hindemith: Mathis der Maler

Madame de Pompadour, French courtier, mistress of Louis XV
 Leo Fall: Madame Pompadour
 Edwin Penhorwood: Too Many Sopranos (spoofed as "Madame Popmpous")

Pompey the Great, Roman military and political leader
 Francesco Cavalli: Pompeo Magno

Empress Poppaea Augusta Sabina, consort of Roman Emperors Nero and Otho
 George Frideric Handel: Agrippina
 Claudio Monteverdi: L'incoronazione di Poppea

Lars Porsena, King of Etruria
 Filippo Amadei, Giovanni Bononcini and George Frideric Handel: Muzio Scevola

Porus, King of Paurava
 George Frideric Handel: Poro

Sister Helen Prejean, American nun, death penalty abolitionist
 Jake Heggie: Dead Man Walking

Přemysl, the Ploughman, first ruler of Bohemia
 Tomaso Albinoni: Primislao, primo re di Boemia

John of Procida, Italian medieval physician and diplomat
 Giuseppe Verdi:  Les vêpres siciliennes

John Proctor, a tavern keeper in 17th century Massachusetts who was hanged for witchcraft during the Salem witch trials
 Robert Ward: The Crucible

Chevalier de Prokesch-Osten
 Arthur Honegger and Jacques Ibert: L'Aiglon

Marcel Proust, French novelist
 Alfred Schnittke: Life with an Idiot

Pharaoh Ptolemy IX Lathyros of Egypt
 George Frideric Handel: Tolomeo

Pharaoh Ptolemy XI Alexander II of Egypt
 George Frideric Handel: Tolomeo

Publius Valerius Publicola, Roman consul
 George Frideric Handel: Muzio Scevola

Yemelyan Pugachev, Russian pretender to the throne
 César Cui: The Captain's Daughter

Qin Shi Huang, first Emperor of unified China
 Tan Dun: The First Emperor

Vasco de Quiroga, member of the second Audiencia in Mexico and first bishop of Michoacán
Miguel Bernal Jiménez: Tata Vasco

R

Nikolay Raevsky, Russian general
 Sergei Prokofiev: War and Peace

Gilles de Rais, French soldier and serial killer of children
 Walter Braunfels: Szenen aus dem Leben der Heiligen Johanna

Elizabeth Raleigh, wife of Sir Walter Raleigh
 Edward German: Merrie England (as Bessie Throckmorton)

Sir Walter Raleigh, English explorer and courtier
 Benjamin Britten: Gloriana
 Gaetano Donizetti: Roberto Devereux
 Edward German: Merrie England

Raphael, Italian painter
 Anton Arensky: Raphael

Grigori Rasputin, Russian mystic, confidant of Tsarina Alexandra
 Einojuhani Rautavaara: Rasputin

Rastislav of Moravia, second ruler of Moravia
 Eugen Suchoň: Svätopluk

Sir Richard Ratcliffe
 Giorgio Battistelli, Richard III (2004)

John Aaron Rawlins, American general, Secretary of War
 Philip Glass: Appomattox

Stenka Razin, cossack leader
 Nikolay Afanasyev: Stenka Razin

Nancy Reagan, US First Lady
 Alexina Louie: Mulroney: The Opera

Ronald Reagan, President of the United States
 Alexina Louie: Mulroney: The Opera
 Erkki-Sven Tüür: Wallenberg

Wilhelm Reich, Austrian-American psychiatrist and psychoanalyst
 Lorenzo Ferrero: Marilyn

Count Adolf Ludvig Ribbing, co-conspirator with Anckarström in the assassination of King Gustav III of Sweden
 Daniel Auber: Gustave III
 Giuseppe Verdi: Un ballo in maschera

Penelope Rich, Lady Rich, English noblewoman
 Benjamin Britten: Gloriana

King Richard I "Coeur de Lion" of England
 André Grétry: Richard Coeur-de-lion
 George Frideric Handel: Riccardo Primo
 Heinrich Marschner: Der Templer und die Jüdin (as the Black Knight)
 Sir Arthur Sullivan: Ivanhoe

King Richard II of England
 Reginald De Koven: The Canterbury Pilgrims

King Richard III of England
 Giorgio Battistelli, Richard III (2004)
 Flavio Testi: Riccardo III

Prince Richard (Richard of Shrewsbury, Duke of York)
 Giorgio Battistelli, Richard III (2004)

Rafael del Riego, Spanish general
 José Melchor Gomis: Le diable à Seville

Louis Riel, executed Canadian rebel
 Harry Somers: Louis Riel

Cola di Rienzo, Roman tribune
 Richard Wagner: Rienzi

Rainer Maria Rilke, Austrian poet
 Nikolai Korndorf: MR (Marina and Rainer)

Arthur Rimbaud, French poet
 Lorenzo Ferrero: Rimbaud, ou le fils du soleil

Diego Rivera, Mexican painter
 Robert Xavier Rodriguez: Frida

King Robert I of Scotland, "Robert the Bruce"
 Gioachino Rossini: Robert Bruce (pastiche)

Robert I, Duke of Normandy
 Giacomo Meyerbeer: Robert le diable

Maximilien Robespierre, French revolutionary figure
 John Eaton: Danton and Robespierre
 Gottfried von Einem: Dantons Tod
 Henry Litolff: Robespierre

Robin Hood (legendary)
 W. H. Birch: The Merrie Men of Sherwood Forest
 Heinrich Marschner: Der Templer und die Jüdin (as Lokslei)
 Sir Arthur Sullivan: Ivanhoe (as Locksley)
 Robin Hood (opera) (disambiguation)

John Wilmot, 2nd Earl of Rochester, English writer, libertine
 Robert Planquette: Nell Gwynne

Roderic, Visigothic King of Hispania
 Alberto Ginastera: Don Rodrigo

King Roger II of Sicily
 Karol Szymanowski: King Roger

Rogneda of Polotsk, consort of Vladimir I of Kiev
 Alexander Serov: Rogneda

Salvator Rosa, Italian painter and poet
 Antônio Carlos Gomes: Salvator Rosa

Gioachino Rossini
 Bernhard Paumgartner, Rossini in Naples

Roxana, wife of Alexander the Great
 George Frideric Handel: Alessandro

Rudolf II, Holy Roman Emperor
 Paul Hindemith: Die Harmonie der Welt

Rudolf II, Count Palatine of the Rhine
 Ignaz Holzbauer: Günther von Schwarzburg

Paavo Ruotsalainen, Finnish farmer and lay preacher
 Joonas Kokkonen: The Last Temptations

Lillian Russell, American actress and singer
 Virgil Thomson: The Mother of Us All

Rustichello da Pisa, Italian writer
 Tan Dun: Marco Polo

S

Hans Sachs, German meistersinger
 Albert Lortzing: Hans Sachs
 Richard Wagner: Die Meistersinger von Nürnberg

Oliver Sacks, British neurologist, writer
 Michael Nyman: The Man Who Mistook His Wife for a Hat (as Dr. S.)

Louis Antoine de Saint-Just, French revolutionary figure
 Gottfried von Einem: Dantons Tod

Ōtomo no Sakanoe no Iratsume, Japanese poet
 Nikolai Korndorf: MR (Marina and Rainer)

Antonio Salieri, Italian-Austrian composer
 P. D. Q. Bach (Peter Schickele): A Little Nightmare Music
 Nikolai Rimsky-Korsakov: Mozart and Salieri

Robert Cecil, 1st Earl of Salisbury, Elizabethan minister
 Benjamin Britten: Gloriana
 Gaetano Donizetti: Roberto Devereux

Sappho, ancient Greek poet
 Charles Gounod: Sapho
 Giovanni Pacini: Saffo

Sardanapalus, king of Assyria
 Giulio Alary: Sardanapale
 Franz Liszt: Sardanapale

William Sargant, British psychiatrist
 Evan Hause: Man: Biology of a Fall

David Sarnoff, American television pioneer
 Evan Hause: The Birth and Theft of Television

Girolamo Savonarola, Florentine heretic and book-burner
 Sir Charles Villiers Stanford: Savonarola (1884)

Diane Sawyer, American television journalist
 Curtis K. Hughes: Say It Ain't So, Joe

Sylvester von Schaumberg
 Paul Hindemith: Mathis der Maler

Hans and Sophie Scholl, sibling co-founders of non-violent resistance movement The White Rose
 Udo Zimmermann: Weiße Rose

Kurt Schwitters, German painter
 Michael Nyman: Man and Boy: Dada

Scipio Aemilianus, aka Scipio Africanus the Younger, Roman general, nephew and adopted son of Scipio Africanus the Elder
 Wolfgang Amadeus Mozart: Il sogno di Scipione, K. 126

Scipio Africanus, aka Scipio Africanus the Elder, Roman general
 Joachim Albertini: Scipione Africano
 Francesco Cavalli: Scipione affricano
 George Frideric Handel: Scipione
 Wolfgang Amadeus Mozart: Il sogno di Scipione, K. 126
 Antonio Sacchini: Scipione in Cartagena

King Sebastian of Portugal
 Gaetano Donizetti: Dom Sébastien

Seleucus I Nicator, King of Syria, founder of the Seleucid Empire
 Étienne Méhul: Stratonice
 Jean-Philippe Rameau: Les fêtes de Polymnie

Seneca the Younger, Roman philosopher, dramatist
 Gavin Bryars, Philip Glass and others: The Civil Wars: A Tree Is Best Measured When It Is Down
 Reinhard Keiser: Octavia
 Claudio Monteverdi: L'incoronazione di Poppea

Sesostris, legendary king of Egypt
 Andrea Adolfati: Sesostri, re d'Egitto
 Domènec Terradellas: Sesostri, re d'Egitto

Sextus Pompey, Roman general, son of Pompey the Great
 Francesco Cavalli: Pompeo Magno
 George Frideric Handel:  Giulio Cesare (in Egitto) (as Sesto)

William Shakespeare, English playwright
 Tan Dun: Marco Polo
 Ambroise Thomas: Le songe d'une nuit d'été

Fyodor Shaklovity, Russian diplomat
 Modest Mussorgsky: Khovanshchina

Andrey Shchelkalov, Russian administrator, official
 Modest Mussorgsky: Boris Godunov

Percy Bysshe Shelley, English poet
 Virgil Thomson: Lord Byron

John Talbot, 1st Earl of Shrewsbury, English soldier
 Giuseppe Verdi: Giovanna d'Arco (as Talbot)

George Talbot, 6th Earl of Shrewsbury, English statesman
 Gaetano Donizetti: Maria Stuarda (as Giorgio Talbot)

Sigismund, Holy Roman Emperor
 Fromental Halévy: La Juive

George Kastrioti Skanderbeg, Albanian national hero
 François Francoeur: Scanderbeg
 Antonio Vivaldi: Scanderbeg

Bengt Skytte, Swedish official
 Wilhelm Peterson-Berger: The Doomsday Prophets

Mark Smeaton, English courtier
 Gaetano Donizetti: Anna Bolena

Anna Nicole Smith, American actress and model
 Mark-Anthony Turnage: Anna Nicole

Scott Smith, American gay activist
 Stewart Wallace: Harvey Milk

Dame Ethel Smyth, English composer
 Roger Scruton: Violet

Socrates, Greek philosopher
 Georg Philipp Telemann: Der geduldige Sokrates

Solon, Greek philosopher
 Reinhard Keiser: Croesus

Sophonisba, Carthaginian noblewoman, daughter of Hasdrubal Gisco
 Maria Teresa Agnesi Pinottini: La Sofonisba
 Francesco Cavalli: Scipione affricano

Agnès Sorel, mistress of King Charles VII of France
 César Cui: The Saracen
 Pyotr Ilyich Tchaikovsky: The Maid of Orleans

Sidney Souers, American admiral and intelligence expert
 Evan Hause: Nightingale: The Last Days of James Forrestal

Edmund Spenser, English poet
 Virgil Thomson: Lord Byron

Arthur Stace, Australian citizen who over 35 years chalked the word "Eternity" over 500,000 times on the footpaths of Sydney
 Jonathan Mills: The Eternity Man

Stanisław I Leszczyński, King of the Polish-Lithuanian Commonwealth
 Giuseppe Verdi: Un giorno di regno (being impersonated by the fictional character the Cavaliere di Belfiore)

Stateira, consort of Darius III of Persia
 Francesco Cavalli: Statira principessa di Persia

Gertrude Stein, American writer
 Virgil Thomson: The Mother of Us All

King Stephen I of Hungary (St. Stephen)
 Ferenc Erkel: István király

Thaddeus Stevens, American politician
 Virgil Thomson: The Mother of Us All

Stigand, Archbishop of Canterbury
 Frederic Hymen Cowen: Harold or the Norman Conquest

Alessandro Stradella, Italian composer
 Friedrich von Flotow: Alessandro Stradella
 Louis Niedermeyer: Stradella
 at least 2 other operas

Stratonice, wife of Seleucus I Nicator, King of Syria
 Étienne Méhul: Stratonice
 Jean-Philippe Rameau: Les fêtes de Polymnie

Johann Strauss I, Viennese waltz composer (father) 
Johann Strauss II, Viennese waltz composer (son)
 Johann Strauss I and Johann Strauss II, arr. Erich Wolfgang Korngold and Julius Bittner: Valses de Vienne

Giuseppina Strepponi, operatic soprano
 Lorenzo Ferrero: Risorgimento!

Nikola Šubić Zrinski, Croatian general
 Ivan Zajc: Nikola Šubić Zrinjski

Ottoman Sultan Suleiman the Magnificent
 Ernst Krenek: Karl V (as Sultan Soliman)
 Ivan Zajc: Nikola Šubić Zrinjski

Lucius Cornelius Sulla, Roman general and dictator
 George Frideric Handel: Silla
 Wolfgang Amadeus Mozart: Lucio Silla

Louis Sullivan, American architect
 Daron Hagen: Shining Brow

Sun Yat-sen, Chinese revolutionary leader
 Huang Ruo: Dr. Sun Yat-sen

Henry Howard, Earl of Surrey, English aristocrat, poet
 Camille Saint-Saëns: Henry VIII

Ivan Susanin, Russian folk hero and martyr
 Mikhail Glinka: A Life for the Tsar

King Svatopluk I of Great Moravia
 Eugen Suchoň: Svätopluk

King Svatopluk II of Great Moravia
 Eugen Suchoň: Svätopluk

Syphax, king of the Libyan tribe of Masaesyli
 Francesco Cavalli: Scipione affricano (as Siface)

Erzsébet Szilágyi, Hungarian noblewoman, wife of János Hunyadi
 Ferenc Erkel: Hunyadi László

T

Augusta Tabor, American philanthropist and first wife of Horace Tabor
 Douglas Moore: The Ballad of Baby Doe

Horace Tabor, American businessman, politician
 Douglas Moore: The Ballad of Baby Doe

Alexandre-Antonin Taché, Canadian Catholic prelate
 Harry Somers: Louis Riel

Rabindranath Tagore, Indian writer
 Philip Glass: Satyagraha

Eugene Talmadge, Governor of Georgia
 Michael Braz: A Scholar Under Siege

Tamerlane: see Timur

Tancred, Prince of Galilee, Norman Crusade leader
 André Campra: Tancrède

Tannhäuser, Medieval German poet
 Richard Wagner: Tannhäuser

Lucius Tarquinius, one of 3 kings of Rome
 Filippo Amadei, Giovanni Bononcini and George Frideric Handel: Muzio Scevola

Sextus Tarquinius, son of Lucius Tarquinius Superbus, King of Rome
 Benjamin Britten: The Rape of Lucretia

Torquato Tasso, Italian poet
 Gaetano Donizetti: Torquato Tasso

John Taverner, 16th century English composer
 Sir Peter Maxwell Davies: Taverner

Dame Elizabeth Taylor, British-US actress
 Michael Daugherty: Jackie O

William Tell, Swiss national hero (disputed historical authenticity)
 Ramon Carnicer: Guglielmo Tell
 André Grétry: Guillaume Tell
 Gioachino Rossini: Guillaume Tell

Edward Teller, Hungarian-American physicist
 John Adams: Doctor Atomic

Beatrice di Tenda, Italian noblewoman
 Vincenzo Bellini: Beatrice di Tenda

Saint Teresa of Ávila, Spanish mystic and theologian
 Virgil Thomson: Four Saints in Three Acts

Nikola Tesla, Croatian scientist
 Constantine Koukias: Tesla - Lightning in His Hand

Themistocles, Athenian general and politician
 Johann Christian Bach: Temistocle
 Josep Duran: Temistocle

James Thomson, Scottish poet
 Virgil Thomson: Lord Byron

Virgil Thomson, American composer and critic
 Virgil Thomson: The Mother of Us All

François Auguste de Thou, French magistrate
 Charles Gounod: Cinq-Mars

Thusnelda, wife of Arminius
 George Frideric Handel: Arminio

Tigranes the Great, Emperor of Armenia
 Tomaso Albinoni: Tigrane, re d'Armenia

Timur, aka Tamerlane, founder of the Timurid dynasty
 Iain Hamilton: Tamberlaine
 George Frideric Handel: Tamerlano
 Antonio Sacchini: Tamerlano
 Antonio Vivaldi: Bajazet

King Tiridates I of Armenia
 Reinhard Keiser: Octavia

Emperor Titus of Rome
 Antonio Caldara: La clemenza di Tito
 Christoph Willibald Gluck: La clemenza di Tito
 Wolfgang Amadeus Mozart: La clemenza di Tito
 Josef Mysliveček: La clemenza di Tito
 and settings of La clemenza di Tito by about 40 other composers

Tiye, mother of Pharaoh Akhenaten of Egypt
 Philip Glass: Akhnaten

Leo Tolstoy, Russian novelist
 Philip Glass: Satyagraha

Tomyris, Queen of the Massagetae
 Alessandro Scarlatti: Tigrane (as Tomiri)

Titus Manlius Torquatus, Roman dictator
 Antonio Vivaldi: Tito Manlio

François Leclerc du Tremblay, "Père Joseph", the original eminence grise
 Charles Gounod: Cinq-Mars

Georges de la Trémoille, French soldier, favourite of Charles VII
 Walter Braunfels: Szenen aus dem Leben der Heiligen Johanna

Olegas Truchanas, Lithuanian-Australian wilderness photographer
 Constantine Koukias: Olegas

Pierre Trudeau, Prime Minister of Canada
 Alexina Louie: Mulroney: The Opera

Harry S. Truman, American President
 Evan Hause: Nightingale: The Last Days of James Forrestal

Marina Tsvetaeva, Russian poet
 Nikolai Korndorf: MR (Marina and Rainer)

Harriet Tubman, American abolitionist and former slave
Thea Musgrave: Harriet, the Woman Called Moses

John Turner, Prime Minister of Canada
 Alexina Louie: Mulroney: The Opera

Wat Tyler, English leader of peasant revolution
 Alan Bush: Wat Tyler

U-V

Pope Urban VIII
 Philip Glass: Galileo Galilei (appears as both Cardinal Maffeo Barberini and Pope Urban VIII)

Valdemar IV of Denmark, King of Denmark from 1340 to 1375
 Andreas Hallén: Valdemarskatten

Valentinian III, Western Roman Emperor
 George Frideric Handel: Ezio

Martin van Buren, American President
 Anthony Davis, Amistad

Theo van Gogh, Dutch art dealer, brother of Vincent van Gogh
 Einojuhani Rautavaara: Vincent
 James Wilson: Letters to Theo

Vincent van Gogh, Dutch painter
 Nevit Kodallı: Van Gogh
 Einojuhani Rautavaara: Vincent
 James Wilson: Letters to Theo
 Christopher Yavelow: The Passion of Vincent van Gogh
Publius Quinctilius Varus, Roman general
 George Frideric Handel: Arminio

Tsar Vasily IV (Shuisky) of Russia
 Antonín Dvořák: Dimitrij
 Modest Mussorgsky: Boris Godunov

Giuseppe Verdi, Italian composer
 Lorenzo Ferrero: Risorgimento!
 Adriana Hölszky: Giuseppe e Sylvia (2000) 

Johannes Vermeer, Dutch painter
 Sir Harrison Birtwistle: The Second Mrs Kong

Lucius Verus: see Vologases IV of Parthia

Micaela Villegas, "La Perricholi", Peruvian actress and singer
 Jacques Offenbach: La Périchole (she is not identified by name, and the remaining characters are all fictional)

François Villon, French poet and vagabond
 George Antheil and Ezra Pound: Le Testament
 Rudolf Friml: The Vagabond King

Francesc de Vinatea, Valencian nobleman, opposed to Alfonso IV of Aragon
 Matilde Salvador i Segarra: Vinatea

Gaius Iulius Vindex, Roman general
 Anton Rubinstein: Neron

Filippo Maria Visconti, ruler of Milan, husband of Beatrice di Tenda
 Vincenzo Bellini: Beatrice di Tenda

Vladimir I, Grand Prince of Kiev
 Alexander Serov: Rogneda

Vladimir III Igorevich, Prince of Putivl and Halych 
Vladimir Yaroslavich, Prince Galitsky, son of Yaroslav Osmomysl, Prince of Halych
 Alexander Borodin: Prince Igor

Vologases IV of Parthia, king
 Girolamo Abos: Lucio Vero, ossia, Il Vologeso

Voltaire, French writer
 Leonard Bernstein: Candide

W

Jacob Wallenberg, Swedish banker
Raoul Wallenberg, Swedish diplomat who rescued many Jews
 Erkki-Sven Tüür: Wallenberg

Konrad von Wallenrode, Grand Master of the Teutonic Knights
 Amilcare Ponchielli: I Lituani (the character Walter is impersonating Wallenrode, referred to in the opera as "Corrado Wallenrod")

Albrecht von Wallenstein, Bohemian military commander
 August Ritter von Adelburg: Wallenstein
 Paul Hindemith: Die Harmonie der Welt

Francis Walsingham, English royal adviser, spymaster
 Rufus Norris and Damon Albarn: Dr Dee: An English Opera

Walther von der Vogelweide, Medieval German poet
 Richard Wagner: Tannhäuser

Princess Wanda, legendary Polish queen
 Antonín Dvořák: Vanda
 Max Vogrich: Vanda

Andy Warhol, American artist
 Michael Daugherty: Jackie O

Daniel Webster, American statesman
 Douglas Moore: The Devil and Daniel Webster
 Virgil Thomson: The Mother of Us All

Dan White, American politician, assassin of George Moscone and Harvey Milk
 Stewart Wallace: Harvey Milk

George Hunter White, American CIA operative
 Evan Hause: Man: Biology of a Fall

Patrick White, Australian novelist
 Elena Kats-Chernin: Whiteley (2019)

Brett Whiteley, Australian painter
Wendy Whiteley, his muse and sometime wife
Arkie Whiteley, their daughter
 Elena Kats-Chernin: Whiteley (2019)

Walt Whitman
 Theodore Morrison: Oscar
 Alberto Garcia Demestres: WOW!

Oscar Wilde, Irish writer
 Theodore Morrison: Oscar
 Alberto Garcia Demestres: WOW!

Queen Wilhelmina of the Netherlands
 Gavin Bryars, Philip Glass and others: The Civil Wars: A Tree Is Best Measured When It Is Down

William the Conqueror (King William I of England)
 Frederic Hymen Cowen: Harold or the Norman Conquest (as William, Duke of Normandy)

William the Silent (William I, Prince of Orange)
 Gavin Bryars, Philip Glass and others: The Civil Wars: A Tree Is Best Measured When It Is Down

Sir Alfred Wills, English judge
 Theodore Morrison: Oscar

Robert R. Wilson, American physicist
 John Adams: Doctor Atomic

Władysław I the Elbow-high (aka Ladislaus I), King of Poland 1320-33
 Józef Elsner: Król Łokietek

Wolfram von Eschenbach, Medieval German poet
 Richard Wagner: Tannhäuser

Thomas Wolsey, English cardinal
 Sir Peter Maxwell Davies: Taverner (not identified as such)

Frank Lloyd Wright, American architect
Catherine "Kitty" (Tobin) Wright (1871–1959), American socialite, social worker, first wife of Frank Lloyd Wright 
 Daron Hagen: Shining Brow

Samuel Joseph Wurzelbacher, aka "Joe the Plumber", American plumber, television celebrity
 Curtis K. Hughes: Say It Ain't So, Joe

X-Y

Malcolm X, African-American human rights activist
 Anthony Davis: X – The Life and Times of Malcolm X

King Xerxes I "The Great" of Persia
 Johann Christian Bach: Temistocle
 Giovanni Bononcini: Xerse
 Francesco Cavalli: Xerse
 George Frideric Handel: Serse
 Hugo Weisgall: Esther

Xiphares, son of Mithridates VI of Pontus
 Wolfgang Amadeus Mozart: Mitridate, re di Ponto

Yaghi-Siyan, Governor of Antioch
 Giuseppe Verdi: I Lombardi alla prima crociata (as Acciano)

Ōtomo no Yakamochi, Japanese poet, diplomat
 Nikolai Korndorf: MR (Marina and Rainer)

Yaroslav I the Wise, Grand Prince of Kiev
 Heorhiy Maiboroda: Yaroslav Mudriy

Aleksey Petrovich Yermolov, Russian general
 Sergei Prokofiev: War and Peace

Yuri II, Grand Prince of Vladimir
 Nikolai Rimsky-Korsakov: The Legend of the Invisible City of Kitezh and the Maiden Fevroniya

Z

Emiliano Zapata, Mexican leader
 Leonardo Balada: Zapata

Zeno, Byzantine emperor
 Tomaso Albinoni: Zenone, imperator d'Oriente

Zenobia, Queen of the Palmyrene Empire
 Tomaso Albinoni: Zenobia, regina de Palmireni
 Gioachino Rossini: Aureliano in Palmira

Zhou Enlai, Chinese political leader
 John Adams: Nixon in China (as Chou En-lai)

Zoroaster
 Jean-Philippe Rameau: Zoroastre

Venerable Zosimas of Palestine
 Ottorino Respighi: Maria egiziaca (as Abbot Zosimus)

Nikola Šubić Zrinski: see Šubić Zrinski

References

Further reading
Jellinek, George, History Through the Opera Glass: From the rise of Caesar to the fall of Napoleon, Pro/Am Music Resources, 1994. 
Morgan, Christopher, Don Carlos and Company: The true stories behind eight well-loved operas, Oxford University Press, 1996. 
Heller, Wendy, "Tacitus Incognito: Opera as History in L'incoronazione di Poppea", Journal of the American Musicological Society, Vol. 52, No. 1 (Spring, 1999), pp. 39–96

Historical characters